= Perger prism =

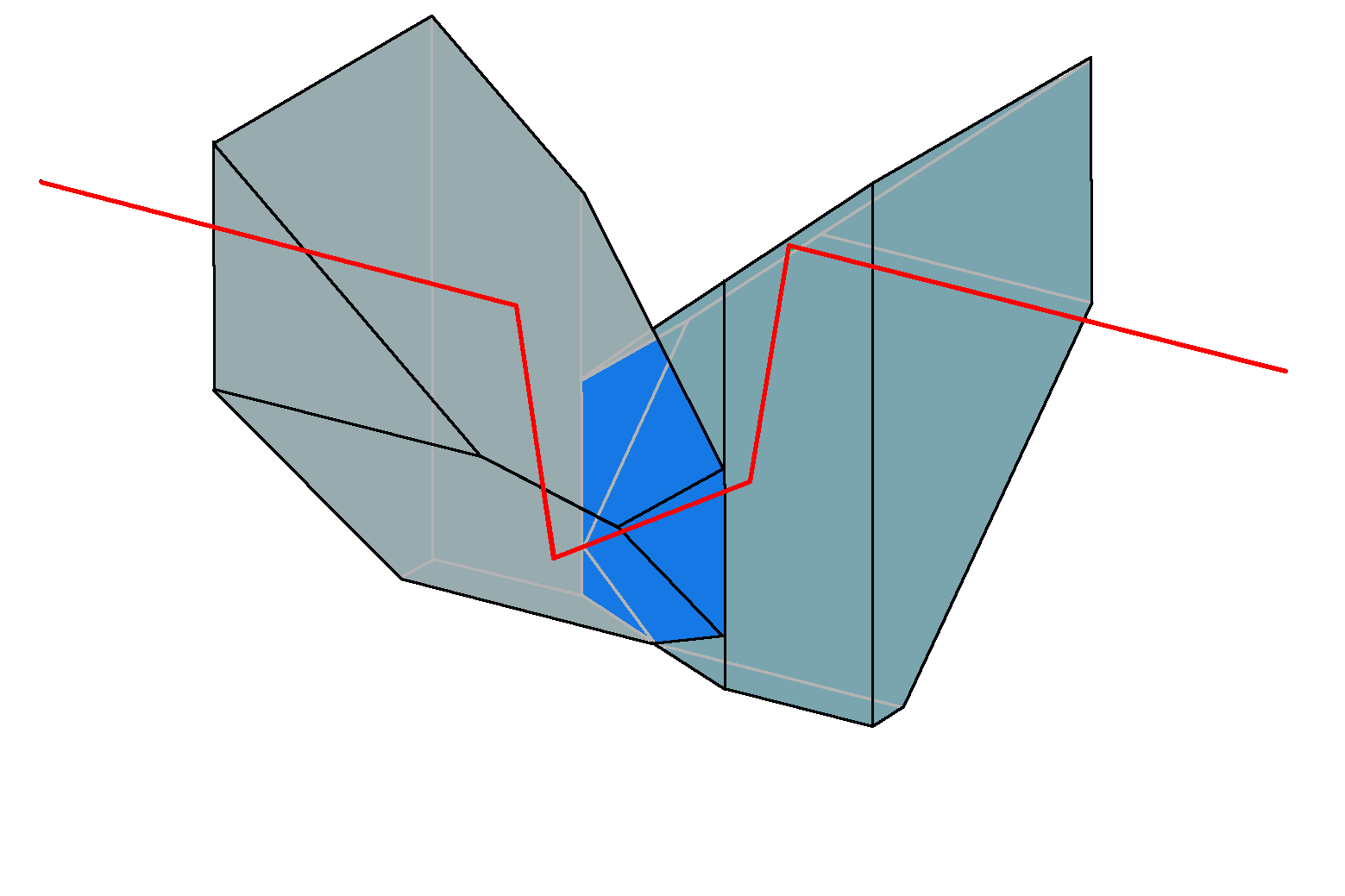
Perger-Prism beam path; the cemented plane is colored blue

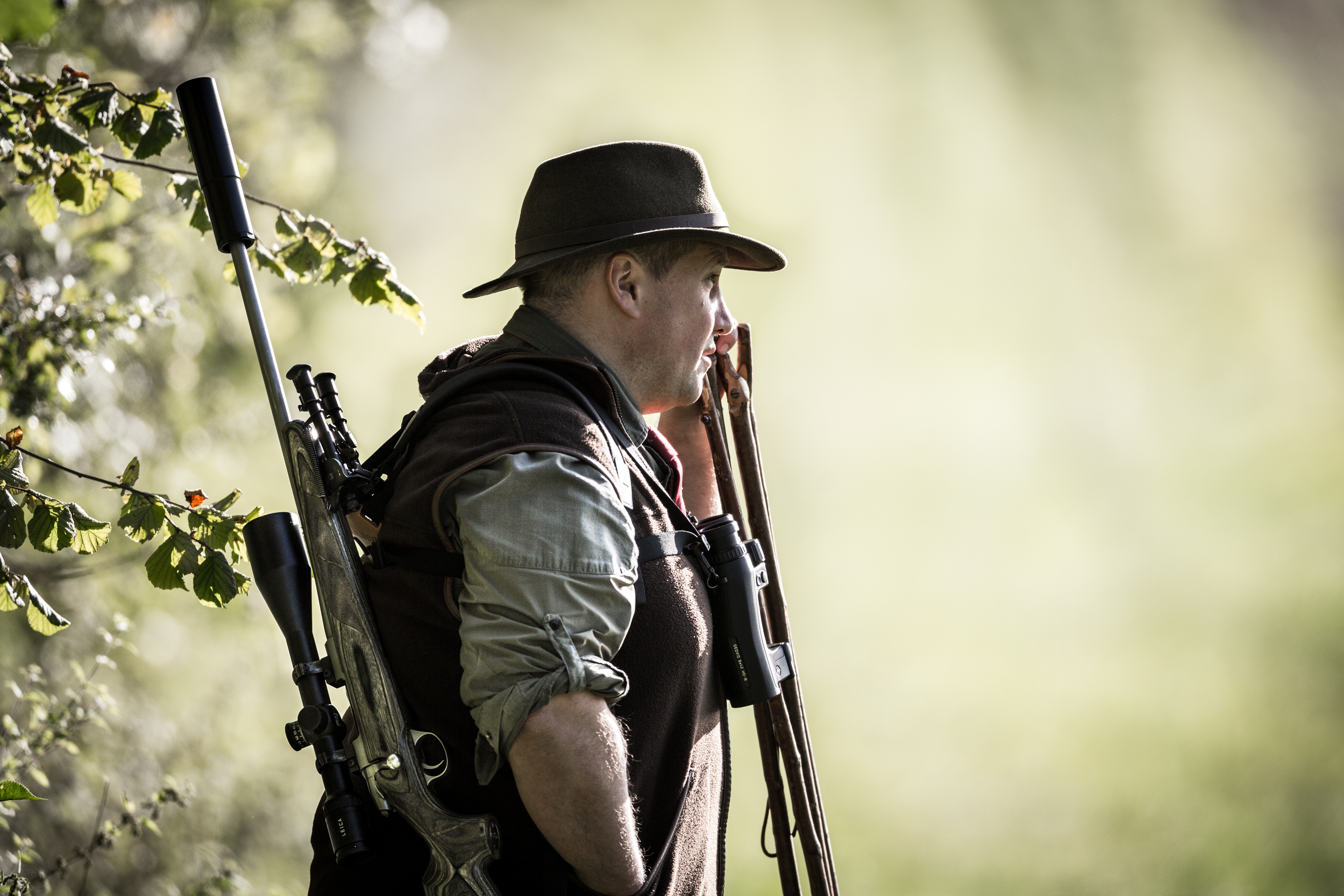
Leica GEOVID 8×42 HD-B laser rangefinding "Perger–Porro prism system" binoculars that have a 14 mm (0.55 in) eyepiece/objective axis offset used by a hunter

A Perger prism or Perger–Porro prism system is a prism, that is used to invert (rotate by 180°) an image. The special feature of this prism is that, like a traditional double Porro prism system, it manages this with only four beam deflections and has neither a roof edge with the accompanying phase correction problems, a mirrored surface or an air gap. However, in contrast to the traditional double Porro prism, it leads to a significantly reduced eyepiece/objective axis offset. The reduced beam offset allows for slimmer, more straight binocular housings usually found in roof prism binoculars. Complicating production requirements make high-quality roof prism binoculars relatively costly to produce compared to in optical quality equivalent Porro prism or "Perger–Porro prism system" binoculars.

Dr. Andreas Perger patented the inversion system in 2011, and it was initially used in the Geovid HD laser rangefinding binoculars (2013 third generation) from the manufacturer Leica. This manufacturer uses the "Perger–Porro prism system" designation for this binoculars line, which features curved (banana shaped) binocular barrels.

== Structure and functionality ==
The Perger prism consists of two glass prisms of different shapes that can be cemented together. The two prisms variant of the Porro Prisma of the second type (Porro–Abbe prism) served as a template for its design. In the next development steps, the cemented surface was first inclined in relation to the beam path. Then the first and last reflecting surfaces were tilted so that the beam has an angle of incidence that exceeds the 45° that is usual in a Porro prism. In this way, the axis offset could be reduced to about 70% of that in the Porro prism of the 2nd type, i.e., be reduced to about half of the value present in the Porro prism.

Since the partial prisms are cemented, and the beam deflection is based entirely on the total reflection principle, there are no reflection losses within this reversal system. The roof prisms, which are widely used in binocular construction, lead to a loss of image quality due to diffraction effects at the roof edge and also require a phase correction coating. These complications are avoided in the Perger prism.

The prism is not dispersive since light enters and exits the prism only at normal incidence. Since the light is reflected an even number of times by the Perger–Porro prism system, the image's handedness is not changed.

According to the patent, the Perger–Porro optical system does not lead to any significant impairment compared to the traditional double Porro system, but only to a slight reduction in brightness to the edge of the field of view (vignetting). The manufacturer who commercially offers this optical system in binoculars claims good brightness and a light transmission of over 90 percent in its 2020 models.

Another advantage of the Perger prism is that the inclined position of the cemented surface to the optical axis can be used to couple in a measuring beam or a display, which enables the use of this type of prism in binoculars with integrated range finders. For this purpose, the cemented surface is provided with an dichroic coating that is matched to the wavelengths of the measuring beam and the display in such a way that just the color of the display will reflect back into the eye of the user.

== Commercial market share in binoculars ==
Since its invention, the patented Perger prism optical design found commercial application on a small scale in some Leica binoculars. The anticipated expiration of the patent term is in 2031.
