= Porro prism =

Type of reflection prism

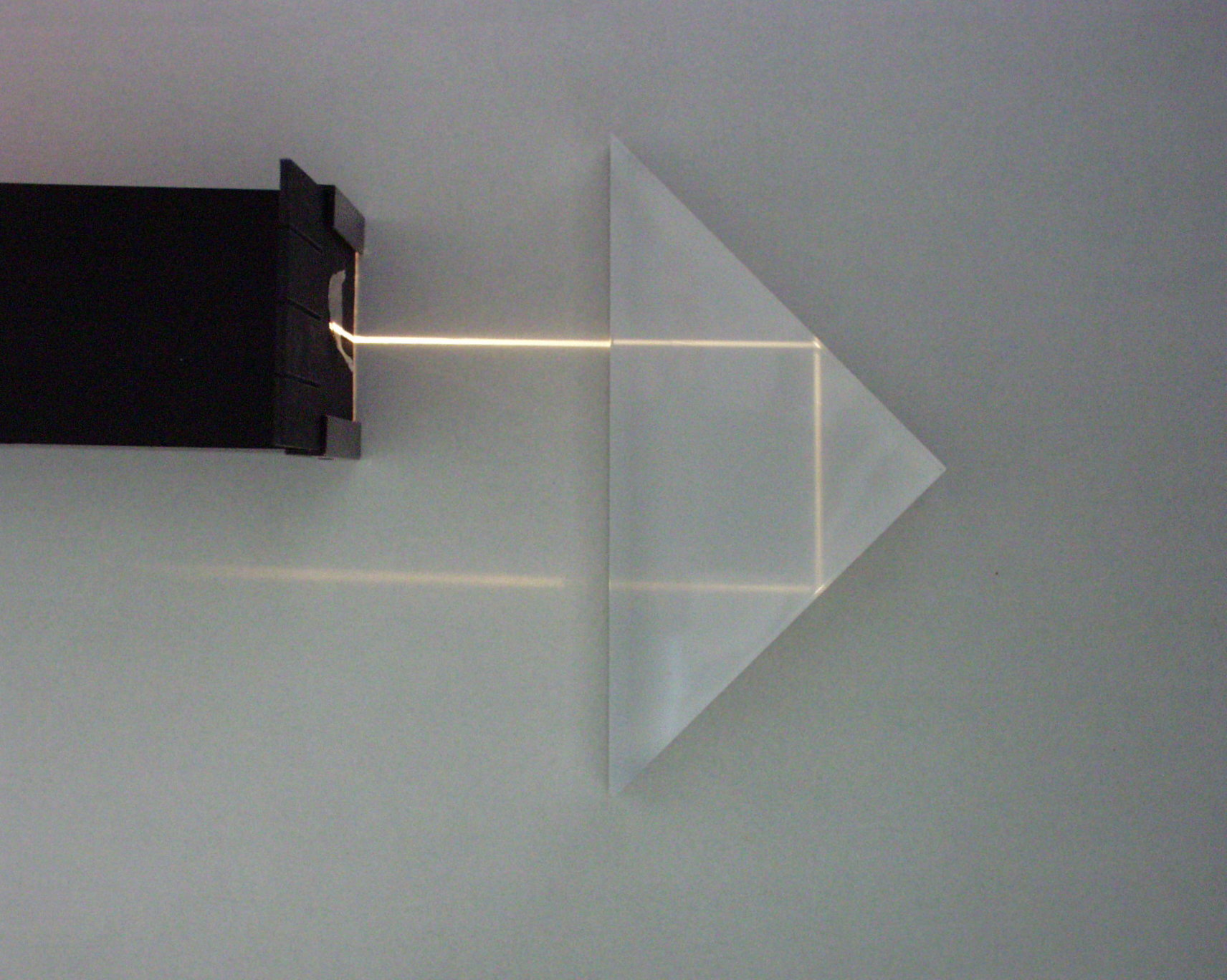
Total internal reflection in Porro prism

A single Porro prism

In optics, a Porro prism, named for its inventor Ignazio Porro, is a type of reflection prism used in optical instruments to alter the orientation of an image.

== Description ==
It consists of a block of material shaped like a right geometric prism with right-angled triangular end faces. In operation, light enters the large rectangular face of the prism, undergoes total internal reflection twice from the sloped faces, and exits again through the large rectangular face. When the light enters and therefore exits the glass at normal incidence, the prism is not dispersive.

An image travelling through a Porro prism is rotated by 180° and exits in the opposite direction offset from its entry point.

While a single Porro prism can be constructed to work as well as a roof prism, it is seldom used as such. Therefore, to reduce the cost of production for a Porro prism, the edge of the roof is usually left out. Sometimes only one small window as an entrance surface and one window as exit surface are polished. The distinction between a roof prism and a Porro prism is that for the roof prism the roof edge lies in the same plane as entrance and exit beam, while for a Porro prism the (left out) roof edge is orthogonal to the plane formed by the beams. Furthermore, the roof prism has no displacement and a deviation typically between 45° and 90°, while in a single Porro prism the beam is typically deviated by 180° and displaced by a distance of at least one beam diameter.

Porro prisms can reflect light rays that are not parallel to the optical axis in such a manner that they are internally reflected off the hypotenuse of the prism. Such an abaxial ray then emerges from the prism having been reflected a third time, thus introducing non image-forming stray light and reducing contrast. Abaxial reflections can be eliminated by putting a groove or notch across the width of the hypotenuse face center of the prism, which blocks these detrimental reflections.

=== Double Porro prism or Porro 1 optical system ===
A double Porro prism system reflects light four times

Porro prisms are most often used in pairs, forming a double Porro prism. A second prism rotated 90° with respect to the first, is placed such that light will traverse both prisms. The net effect of the prism system is a beam parallel to but displaced from its original direction, with the image rotated 180°. A double Porro system provides four internal reflections. Since the light is reflected an even number of times, the image's handedness is not changed.

Double Porro prism systems are used in small optical telescopes to re-orient an inverted image (an arrangement is known as an image erection system), and especially in many binoculars where they both erect the image and provide a longer, folded distance between the objective lenses and the eyepieces. When there is an air gap between the two prism there are four glass/air transition surfaces.

Sometimes, the two components of the double Porro system are cemented together, and the prisms may be truncated to save weight and size and reduce glass/air transition surfaces to two and hence light transmission loss.

=== Porro 2 optical system ===
There is also a Porro prism of the second type variant, which consists of three prisms of different shapes that can be and commonly are cemented together and also deflects the beam path four times by 90°. A double-reflecting half-cube prism is placed between two smaller, only once-reflecting half-cube prisms. The principal sections of the outer prisms are arranged at right angles to the central prism. Its advantage is that there is no vertical offset of the beam path. Porro prism of the second type optical systems are not very common and generally applied in larger and military binoculars.

==== Porro–Abbe and Porro–Perger optical system variants ====
Another variant of the Porro prism of the second type with the same function is the Porro–Abbe prism; a two prisms variant that reduces the lateral beam axis offset by 23% compared to a traditional double Porro prism system in binoculars.

The Porro–Abbe two prisms variant has been further developed into the Perger prism, which combines the properties of Porro and roof top prism, requiring only a small offset of the beam path and also enabling a measuring beam or an illuminated display to be reflected through the changed angle of the reflection surfaces and the cemented surface. As of 2013 Perger prisms are commercially used on a small scale in Perger–Porro prism system binoculars with integrated laser range finders.

== Binoculars ==
A typical double Porro prism binoculars design

Traditionally binoculars used a double Porro prism design, which resulted in a distinctive offset, zig-zag shape. Roof prism designs allow a simpler exterior, and are now common but they are more expensive to produce. Complicated production requirements make high-quality roof prism design binoculars relatively costly to produce compared to Porro prism designs of equivalent optical quality. Good-quality Porro prism design binoculars often feature about 1.5 millimetres (0.06 in) deep grooves or notches ground across the width of the hypotenuse face center of the prisms, to eliminate image quality reducing abaxial non image-forming reflections. As human eyes are ergonomically limited by their interpupillary distance the offset and separation of big (60^{+} mm wide) diameter objective lenses and the eyepieces becomes a practical advantage in a stereoscopic optical product.

In the early 2020s the commercial market share of Porro prism type binoculars had become the second numerous compared to other prism type optical designs.

== Use in cameras ==
Most single lens reflex cameras use a roof pentaprism, and therefore have a distinctive top "peak". By contrast, a Porro prism allows a much tidier design, as used in the following models:

- Olympus Pen F, FT and FV
- Olympus E-300
