= Porro–Abbe prism =

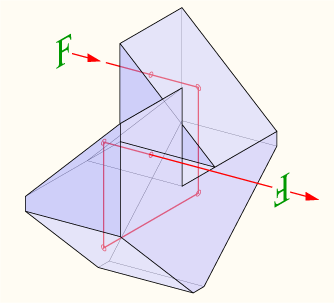
A Porro–Abbe prism

A Porro–Abbe prism (sometimes called a Abbe–Porro prism), named for Ignazio Porro and Ernst Abbe, is a type of reflection prism used in some optical instruments to alter the orientation of an image. It is a variant of the more common double Porro prism configuration.

It is made from a piece of glass shaped like four right-angled reflecting prisms joined face-to-face in a twisted fashion. Light enters one flat face, is internally reflected four times (incident at an angle of 45º) from the sloping faces of the prism, and exits the second flat face offset from, but in the same direction as the entrance beam. The image is rotated 180° in the process, and for this reason the prism is used as an image erection system in some binoculars, and camera viewfinders. The Porro–Abbe system reduces the lateral beam axis offset by 23% compared to a traditional double Porro prism system in binoculars.

The prism is not dispersive since light enters and exits the prism only at normal incidence. Since the light is four times reflected, an even number of times, the image's handedness is not changed.

For ease of manufacture, the prism is often made as a pair of double-right-angled prisms and the two halves cemented together. A single half of the assembly is sometimes also called a Porro–Abbe prism.
