= Ignazio Porro =

19th-century, Italian, optics inventor

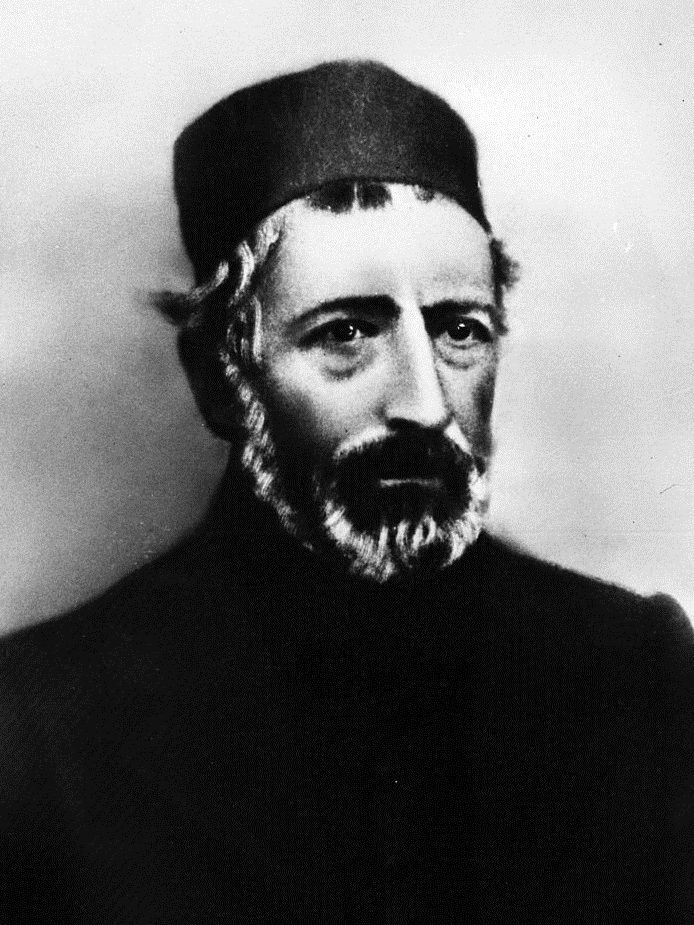
Ignazio Porro

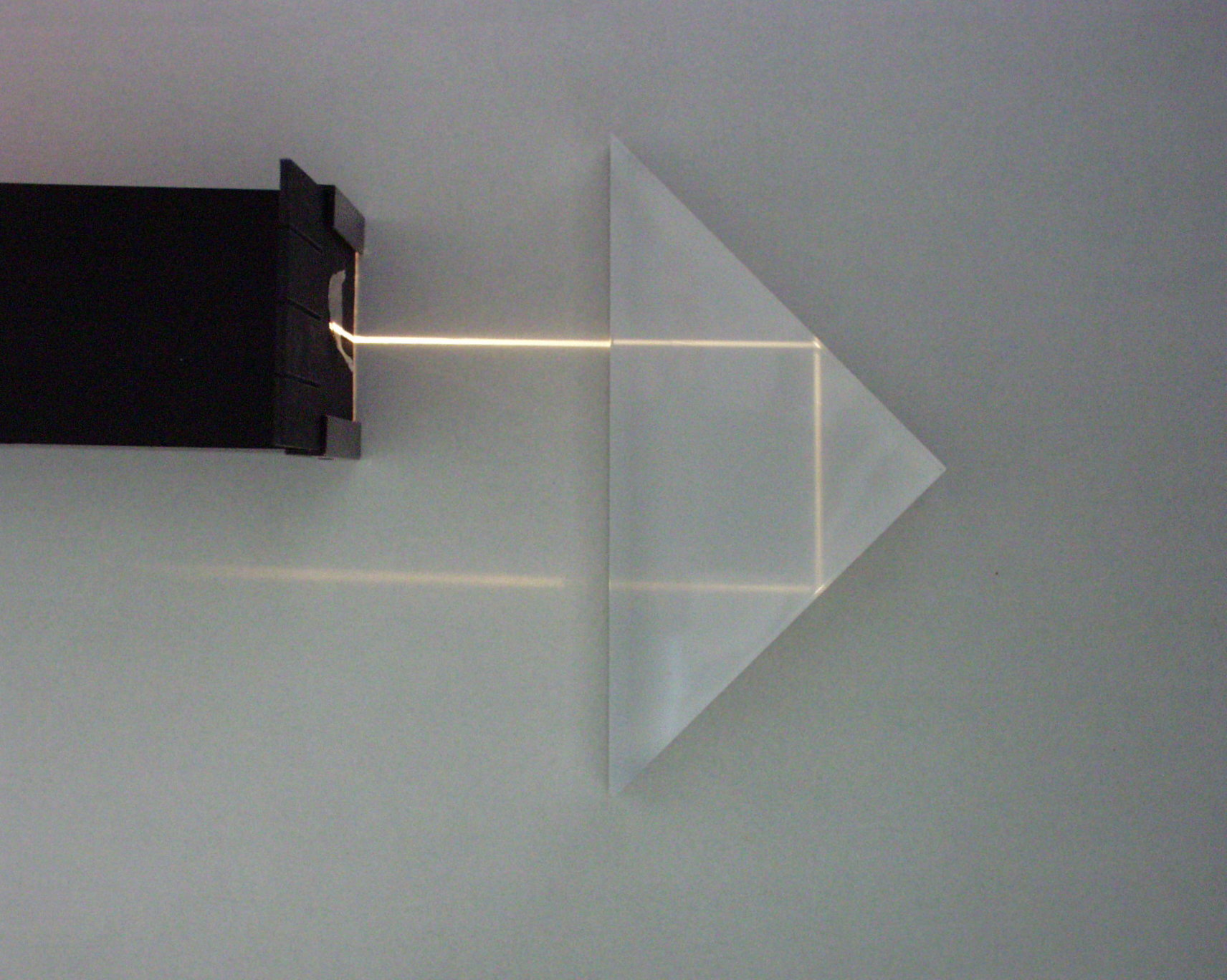
Total internal reflection in Porro prism

Ignazio Porro (25 November 1801 – 8 October 1875) was an Italian inventor of optical instruments.

Porro's name is most closely associated with the prism system which he invented around 1850 and which is used in the construction of Porro prism binoculars.

He also developed a strip camera in 1853 for mapping, which was one of the earliest such.

== See also ==
- Porro–Abbe prism

== Works ==
- Tachéometrie, ou L'art de lever des plans et de faire les nivellements avec beaucoup de précision et une économie de temps considerable (in French). Paris: Dalmont. 1858.
- Manuale pratico di geodesia moderna (in Italian). Milano: Tipografia e litografia degli ingegneri. 1869.
