= Binoculars =

Pair of telescopes mounted side-by-side

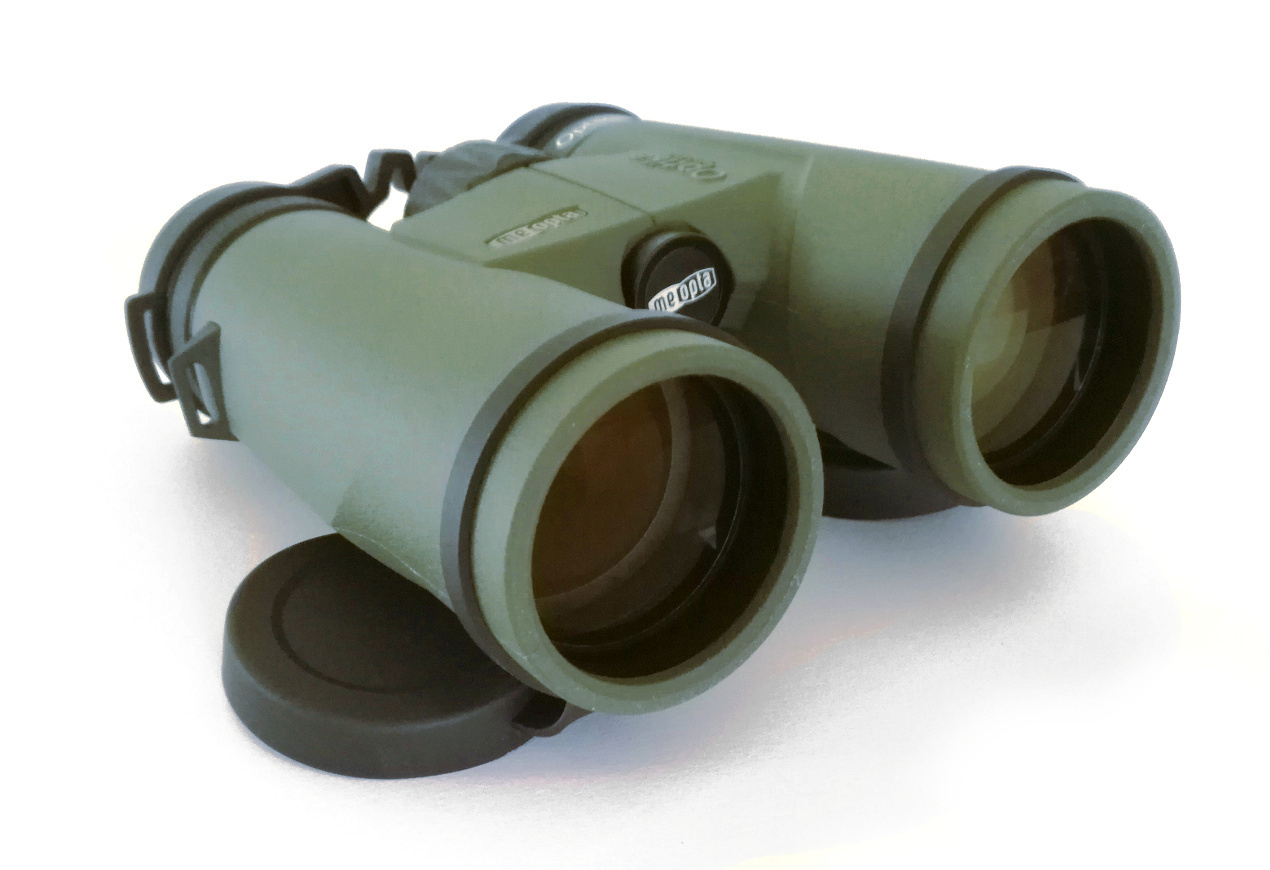
8×42 roof prism binoculars with rainguard and opened tethered lens caps

A pair of compact opera-viewing binoculars, with a handle for single-hand holding

A coin-operated tower-viewing binoculars at Kozan Castle, Turkey

Binoculars or field glasses is an optical instrument made of a pair of identical refracting telescopes mounted side-by-side towards the same direction, providing the user with magnified vision for both eyes (i.e. binocular vision). Most binoculars are sized to be held using both hands, although sizes vary widely from small, single-hand opera glasses to large pedestal-mounted tower viewers.

Unlike a monocular telescope, binoculars give users a three-dimensional image: each eyepiece presents a slightly different image to each of the viewer's eyes and the parallax allows the visual cortex to generate an impression of depth.

== Optical design evolution ==
=== Galilean ===
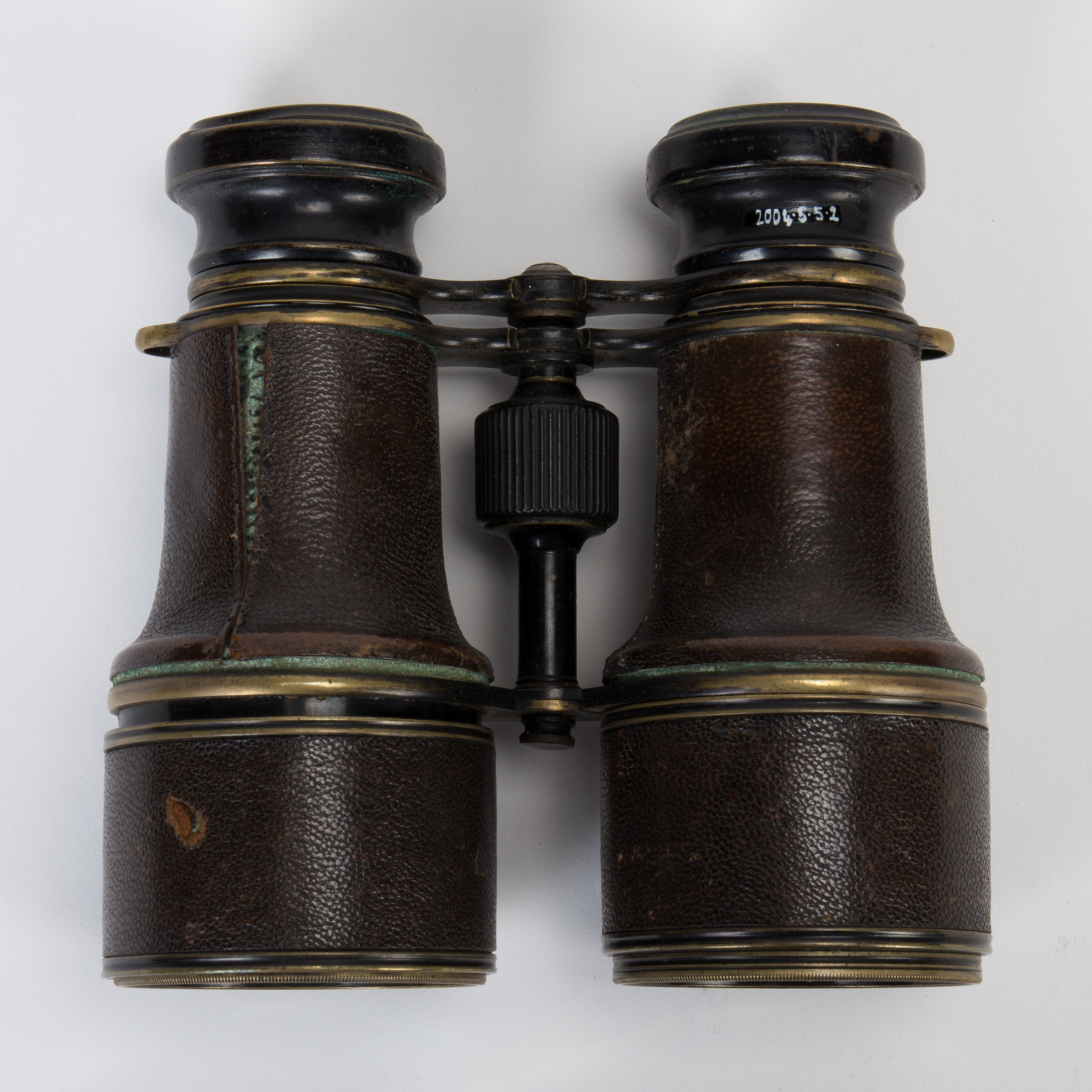
WW1 era Galilean type binoculars

Almost from the invention of the telescope in the 17th century the advantages of mounting two of them side by side for binocular vision seems to have been explored. Most early binoculars used Galilean optics; that is, they used a convex objective and a concave eyepiece lens. The Galilean design has the advantage of presenting an erect image but has a narrow field of view and is not capable of very high magnification. This type of construction is still used in very cheap models and in opera glasses or theater glasses. The Galilean design is also used in low magnification binocular surgical and jewelers' loupes because they can be very short and produce an upright image without extra or unusual erecting optics, reducing expense and overall weight. They also have large exit pupils, making centering less critical, and the narrow field of view works well in those applications. These are typically mounted on an eyeglass frame or custom-fit onto eyeglasses.

=== Keplerian ===
An improved image and higher magnification are achieved in binoculars employing Keplerian optics, where the image formed by the objective lens is viewed through a positive eyepiece lens (ocular). Since the Keplerian configuration produces an inverted image, different methods are used to turn the image the right way up.

==== Erecting lenses ====
In aprismatic binoculars with Keplerian optics (which were sometimes called "twin telescopes"), each tube has one or two additional lenses (relay lens) between the objective and the eyepiece. These lenses are used to erect the image. The binoculars with erecting lenses had a serious disadvantage: they are too long. Such binoculars were popular in the 1800s (for example, G. & S. Merz models). The Keplerian "twin telescopes" binoculars were optically and mechanically hard to manufacture, but it took until the 1890s to supersede them with better prism-based technology.

==== Prism ====
Optical prisms added to the design enabled the display of the image the right way up without needing as many lenses, and decreasing the overall length of the instrument, typically using Porro prism or roof prism systems. The Italian inventor of optical instruments Ignazio Porro worked during the 1860s with Hofmann in Paris to produce monoculars using the same prism configuration used in modern Porro prism binoculars. At the 1873 Vienna Trade Fair German optical designer and scientist Ernst Abbe displayed a prism telescope with two cemented Porro prisms. The optical solutions of Porro and Abbe were theoretically sound, but the employed prism systems failed in practice primarily due to insufficient glass quality.

===== Porro =====
Double Porro prism design

Porro prism binoculars are named after Ignazio Porro, who patented this image erecting system in 1854. The later refinement by Ernst Abbe and his cooperation with glass scientist Otto Schott, who managed to produce a better type of Crown glass in 1888, and instrument maker Carl Zeiss resulted in 1894 in the commercial introduction of improved 'modern' Porro prism binoculars by the Carl Zeiss company. Binoculars of this type use a pair of Porro prisms in a Z-shaped configuration to erect the image. This results in wide binoculars, with objective lenses that are well separated and offset from the eyepieces, giving a better sensation of depth. Porro prism designs have the added benefit of folding the optical path so that the physical length of the binoculars is less than the focal length of the objective. Porro prism binoculars were made in such a way to erect an image in a relatively small space, thus binoculars using prisms started in this way.

Porro prisms require typically within 10 arcminutes (1/6 of 1 degree) tolerances for alignment of their optical elements (collimation) at the factory. Sometimes Porro prisms binoculars need their prisms set to be re-aligned to bring them into collimation. Good-quality Porro prism design binoculars often feature about 1.5 millimetres (0.06 in) deep grooves or notches ground across the width of the hypotenuse face center of the prisms, to eliminate image-quality-reducing abaxial non-image-forming reflections. Porro prism binoculars can offer good optical performance with relatively little manufacturing effort and as human eyes are ergonomically limited by their interpupillary distance the offset and separation of big (60^{+} mm wide) diameter objective lenses and the eyepieces becomes a practical advantage in a stereoscopic optical product.

In the early 2020s, the commercial market share of Porro prism-type binoculars had become the second most numerous compared to other prism-type optical designs.

There are alternative Porro prism-based systems available that find application in binoculars on a small scale, like the Perger prism that offers a significantly reduced axial offset compared to traditional Porro prism designs .

===== Roof =====
Schmidt–Pechan "roof" prism design

Abbe–Koenig "roof" prism design

Roof prism binoculars may have appeared as early as the 1870s in a design by Achille Victor Emile Daubresse. In 1897 Moritz Hensoldt began marketing pentaprism based roof prism binoculars.

Most roof prism binoculars use either the Schmidt–Pechan prism (invented in 1899) or the Abbe–Koenig prism (named after Ernst Karl Abbe and Albert König and patented by Carl Zeiss in 1905) designs to erect the image and fold the optical path. They have objective lenses that are approximately in a line with the eyepieces.

Binoculars with roof prisms have been in use to a large extent since the second half of the 20th century. Roof prism designs result in objective lenses that are almost or totally in line with the eyepieces, creating an instrument that is narrower and more compact than Porro prisms and lighter. There is also a difference in image brightness. Porro prism and Abbe–Koenig roof-prism binoculars will inherently produce a brighter image than Schmidt–Pechan roof prism binoculars of the same magnification, objective size, and optical quality, because the Schmidt-Pechan roof-prism design employs mirror-coated surfaces that reduce light transmission.

In roof prism designs, optically relevant prism angles must be correct within 2 arcseconds (1/1,800 of 1 degree) to avoid seeing an obstructive double image. Maintaining such tight production tolerances for the alignment of their optical elements by laser or interference (collimation) at an affordable price point is challenging. To avoid the need for later re-collimation, the prisms are generally aligned at the factory and then permanently fixed to a metal plate. These complicating production requirements make high-quality roof prism binoculars more costly to produce than Porro prism binoculars of equivalent optical quality and until phase correction coatings were invented in 1988 Porro prism binoculars optically offered superior resolution and contrast to non-phase corrected roof prism binoculars.

In the early 2020s, the commercial offering of Schmidt-Pechan designs exceeds the Abbe-Koenig design offerings and had become the dominant optical design compared to other prism-type designs.

Alternative roof prism-based designs like the Uppendahl prism system composed of three prisms cemented together were and are commercially offered on a small scale.

== Optical systems and their practical effect on binoculars housing shapes ==
The optical system of modern binoculars consists of three main optical assemblies:

- Objective lens assembly. This is the lens assembly at the front of the binoculars. It gathers light from the object and forms an image at the image plane.
- Image orientation correction assembly. This is usually a prism assembly that shortens the optical path. Without this, the image would be inverted and laterally reversed, which is inconvenient for the user.
- Eyepiece lens assembly. This is the lens assembly near the user's eyes. Its function is to magnify the image.
Binoculars diagram showing a Porro prism design

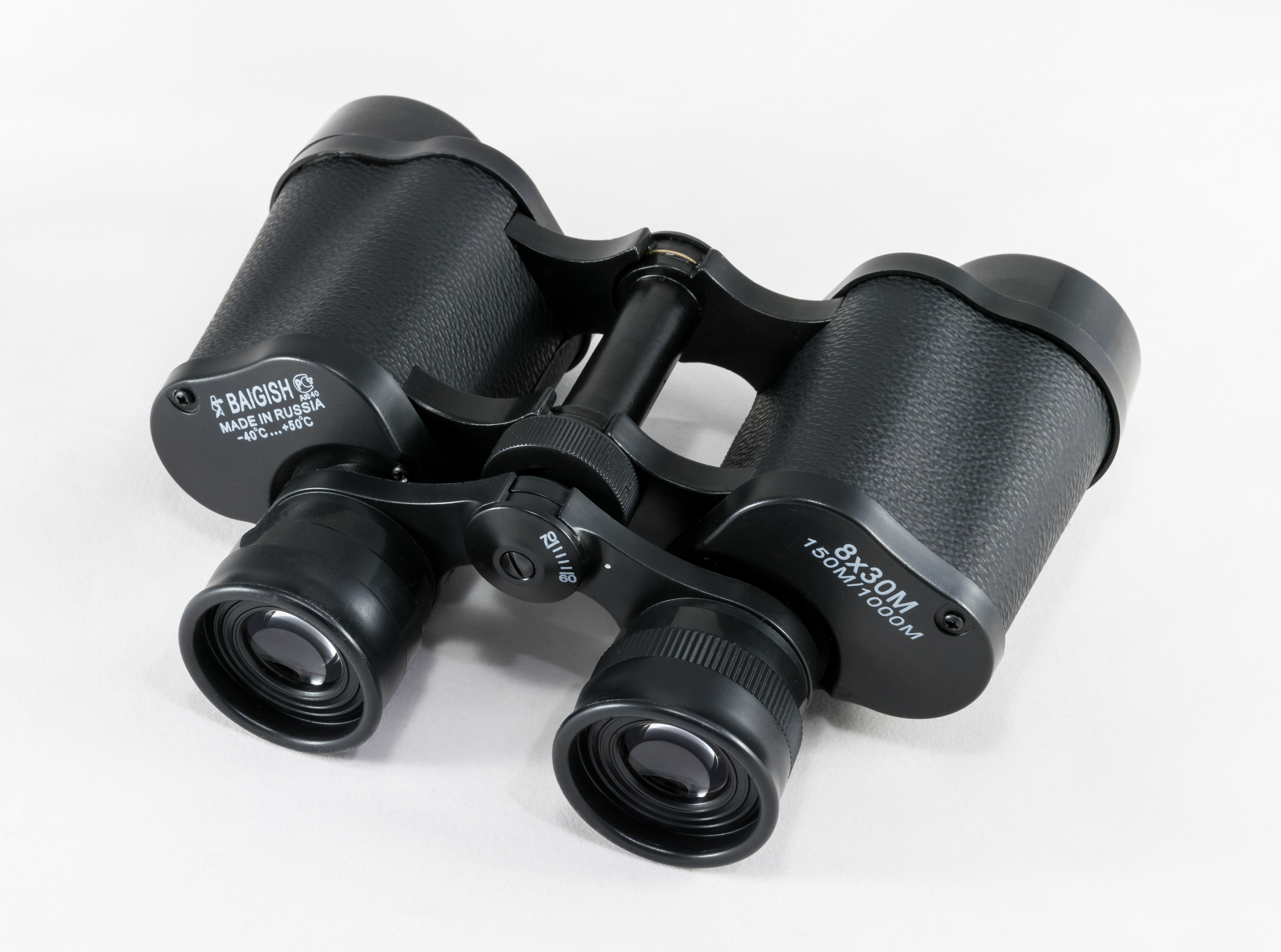
Porro prism binoculars, with distinctive eyepiece/objective axis offset

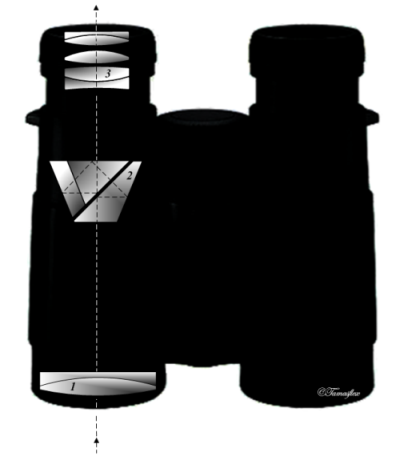
Binoculars diagram showing a Schmidt–Pechan roof prism design

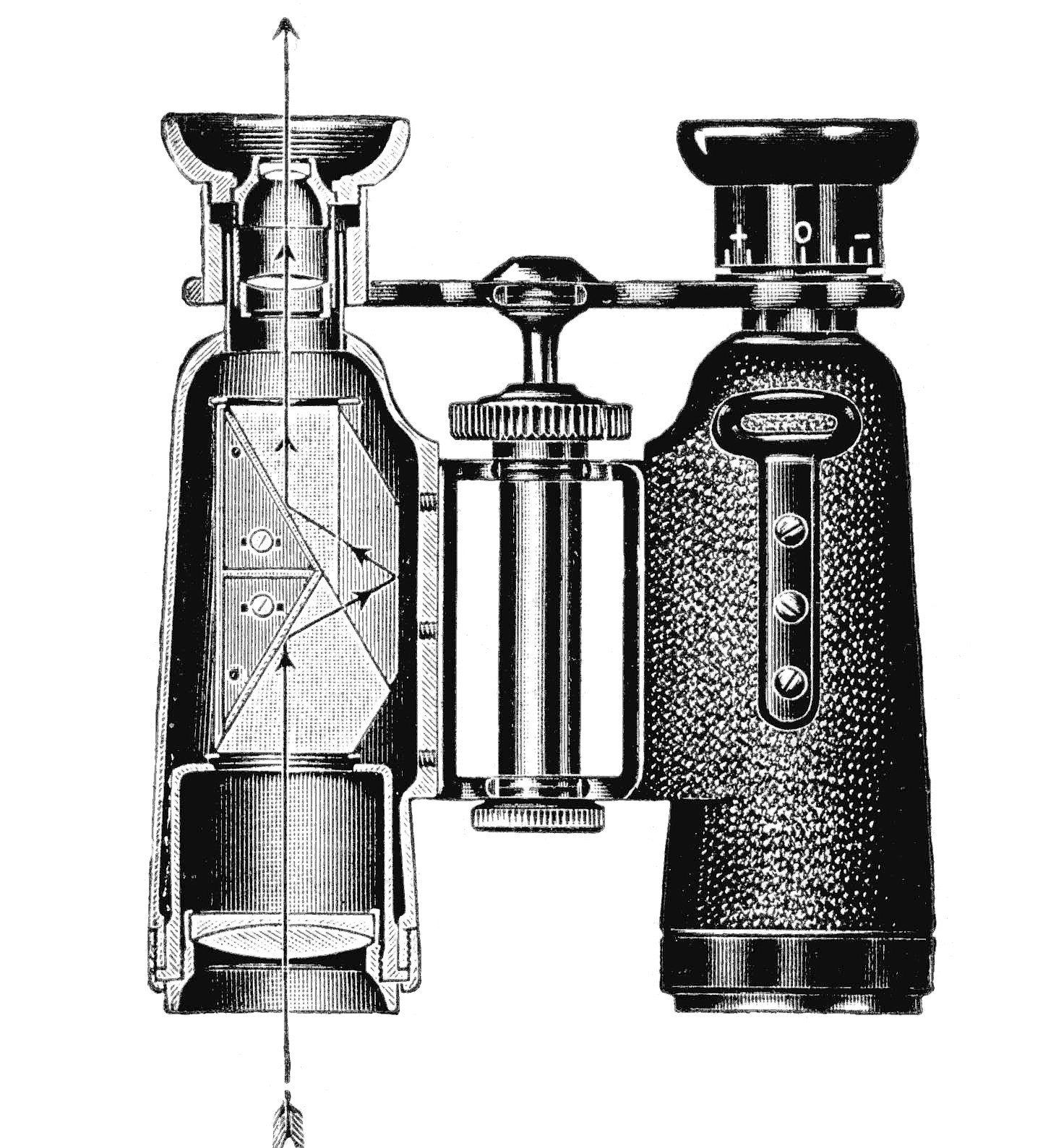
Binoculars diagram showing an Abbe–Koenig roof prism design

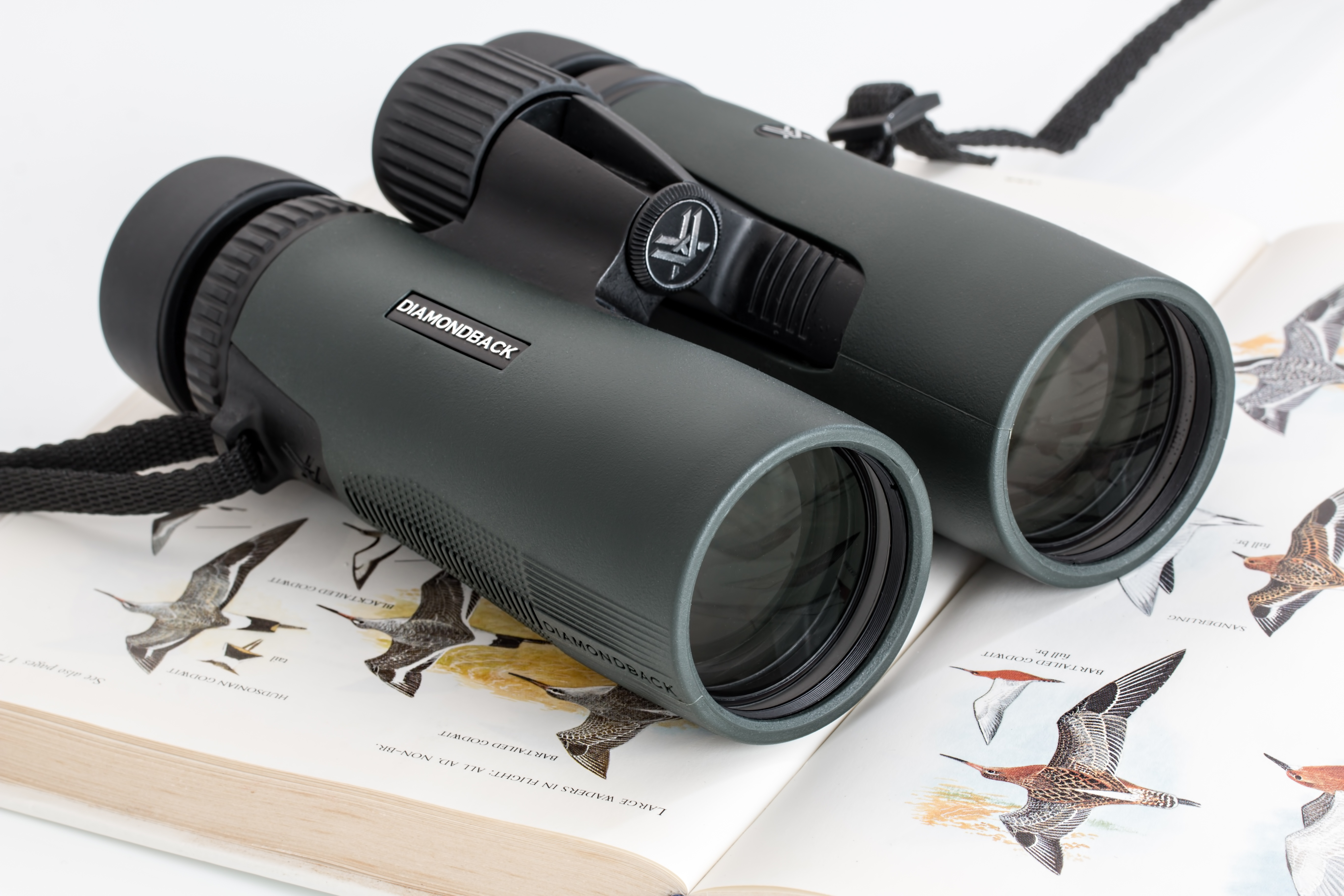
Roof prism binoculars, with the eyepiece in line with the objective

Although different prism systems have optical design-induced advantages and disadvantages when compared, due to technological progress in fields like optical coatings, optical glass manufacturing, etcetera, differences in the early 2020s in high-quality binoculars practically became irrelevant. At high-quality price points, similar optical performance can be achieved with every commonly applied optical system. This was 20–30 years earlier not possible, as occurring optical disadvantages and problems could at that time not be technically mitigated to practical irrelevancy. Relevant differences in optical performance in the sub-high-quality price categories can still be observed with roof prism-type binoculars today because well-executed technical problem mitigation measures and narrow manufacturing tolerances remain difficult and cost-intensive.

== Optical parameters ==
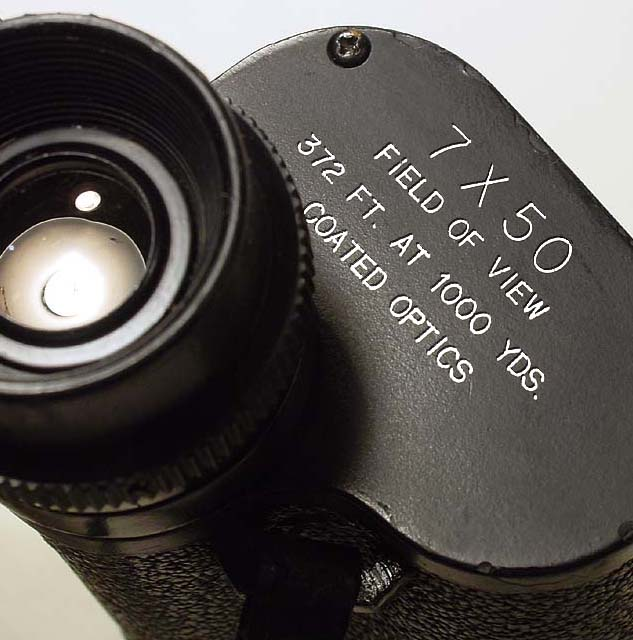
Parameters listed on the prism cover plate describing 7 power magnification binoculars with a 50 mm objective diameter and a 372 foot (113.39 m) field of view at 1,000 yards (914.4 m)

Binoculars are usually designed for specific applications. These different designs require certain optical parameters which may be listed on the prism cover plate of the binoculars. Those parameters are:

=== Magnification ===
Given as the first number in a binocular description (e.g., 7×35, 10×50), magnification is the ratio of the focal length of the objective divided by the focal length of the eyepiece. This gives the magnifying power of binoculars (sometimes expressed as "diameters"). A magnification factor of 7, for example, produces an image 7 times larger than the original seen from that distance. The desirable amount of magnification depends upon the intended application, and in most binoculars is a permanent, non-adjustable feature of the device (zoom binoculars are the exception). Hand-held binoculars typically have magnifications ranging from 7× to 10×, so they will be less susceptible to the effects of shaking hands. A larger magnification leads to a smaller field of view and may require a tripod for image stability. Some specialized binoculars for astronomy or military use have magnifications ranging from 15× to 25×.

=== Objective diameter ===
Given as the second number in a binocular description (e.g., 7×35, 10×50), the diameter of the objective lens determines the resolution (sharpness) and how much light can be gathered to form an image. When two different binoculars have equal magnification, equal quality, and produce a sufficiently matched exit pupil (see below), the larger objective diameter produces a "brighter" (Note: "brightness" refers here to luminous flux on the retina and not to the photometrical definition of brightness: with the hypothesis of the match exit pupil, the (photometrical) brightness of the magnified scene (the illuminance of the retina) is the same (with an ideal lossless binoculars) as the one perceived by the naked eye in the same ambient light conditions, according to the conservation of luminance in lossless optical systems. Note that, in any case, with the same magnification and match exit pupil, the luminous flux on the retina increases only in an absolute way, but does not if relatively compared to the naked eye vision in each of the two different ambient light conditions.) and sharper image. An 8×40, then, will produce a "brighter" and sharper image than an 8×25, even though both enlarge the image an identical eight times. The larger front lenses in the 8×40 also produce wider beams of light (exit pupil) that leave the eyepieces. This makes it more comfortable to view with an 8×40 than an 8×25. A pair of 10×50 binoculars is better than a pair of 8×40 binoculars for magnification, sharpness and luminous flux. Objective diameter is usually expressed in millimeters. It is customary to categorize binoculars by the magnification × the objective diameter; e.g., 7×50. Smaller binoculars may have a diameter of as low as 22 mm; 35 mm and 50 mm are common diameters for field binoculars; astronomical binoculars have diameters ranging from 70 mm to 150 mm.

=== Field of view ===
The field of view of a pair of binoculars depends on its optical design and in general is inversely proportional to the magnifying power. It is usually notated in a linear value, such as how many feet (meters) in width will be seen at 1,000 yards (or 1,000 m), or in an angular value of how many degrees can be viewed.

=== Exit pupil ===
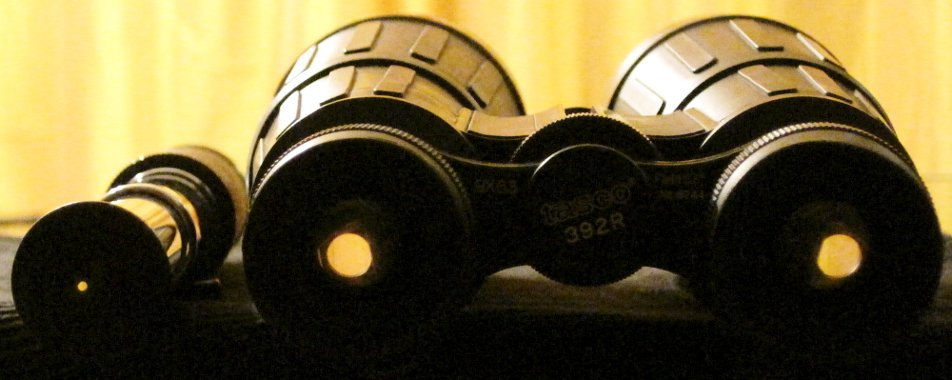
The small exit pupil of a 25×30 telescope and large exit pupils of 9×63 binoculars, the latter suitable for use in low light

Binoculars concentrate the light gathered by the objective into a beam, of which the diameter, the exit pupil, is the objective diameter divided by the magnifying power. For maximum effective light-gathering and brightest image, and to maximize the sharpness, the exit pupil should at least equal the diameter of the pupil of the human eye: about 7 mm at night and about 3 mm in the daytime, decreasing with age. If the cone of light streaming out of the binoculars is larger than the pupil it is going into, any light larger than the pupil is wasted. In daytime use, the human pupil is typically dilated about 3 mm, which is about the exit pupil of a 7×21 binocular. Much larger 7×50 binoculars will produce a (7.14 mm) cone of light bigger than the pupil it is entering, and this light will, in the daytime, be wasted. An exit pupil that is too small also will present an observer with a dimmer view, since only a small portion of the light-gathering surface of the retina is used. For applications where equipment must be carried (birdwatching, hunting), users opt for much smaller (lighter) binoculars with an exit pupil that matches their expected iris diameter so they will have maximum resolution but are not carrying the weight of wasted aperture.

A larger exit pupil makes it easier to put the eye where it can receive the light; anywhere in the large exit pupil cone of light will do. This ease of placement helps avoid, especially in large field of view binoculars, vignetting, which brings to the viewer an image with its borders darkened because the light from them is partially blocked, and it means that the image can be quickly found, which is important when looking at birds or game animals that move rapidly, or for a seafarer on the deck of a pitching vessel or observing from a moving vehicle. Narrow exit pupil binoculars also may be fatiguing because the instrument must be held exactly in place in front of the eyes to provide a useful image. Finally, many people use their binoculars at dawn, at dusk, in overcast conditions, or at night, when their pupils are larger. Thus, the daytime exit pupil is not a universally desirable standard. For comfort, ease of use, and flexibility in applications, larger binoculars with larger exit pupils are satisfactory choices even if their capability is not fully used by day.

=== Twilight factor and relative brightness ===
Before innovations like anti-reflective coatings were commonly used in binoculars, their performance was often mathematically expressed. Nowadays, the practically achievable instrumentally measurable brightness of binoculars rely on a complex mix of factors like the quality of optical glass used and various applied optical coatings and not just the magnification and the size of objective lenses.

The twilight factor for binoculars can be calculated by first multiplying the magnification by the objective lens diameter and then finding the square root of the result. For instance, the twilight factor of 7×50 binoculars is therefore the square root of 7 × 50: the square root of 350 = 18.71. The higher the twilight factor, mathematically, the better the resolution of the binoculars when observing under dim light conditions. Mathematically, 7×50 binoculars have exactly the same twilight factor as 70×5 ones, but 70×5 binoculars are useless during twilight and also in well-lit conditions as they would offer only a 0.14 mm exit pupil. The twilight factor without knowing the accompanying more decisive exit pupil does not permit a practical determination of the low light capability of binoculars. Ideally, the exit pupil should be at least as large as the pupil diameter of the user's dark-adapted eyes in circumstances with no extraneous light.

A primarily historic, more meaningful mathematical approach to indicate the level of clarity and brightness in binoculars was relative brightness. It is calculated by squaring the diameter of the exit pupil. In the above 7×50 binoculars example, this means that their relative brightness index is 51 (7.14 × 7.14 = 51). The higher the relative brightness index number, mathematically, the better the binoculars are suited for low light use.

=== Eye relief ===
Eye relief is the distance from the rear eyepiece lens to the exit pupil or eye point. It is the distance the observer must position his or her eye behind the eyepiece in order to see an unvignetted image. The longer the focal length of the eyepiece, the greater the potential eye relief. Binoculars may have eye relief ranging from a few millimeters to 25 mm or more. Eye relief can be particularly important for eyeglasses wearers. The eye of an eyeglasses wearer is typically farther from the eye piece which necessitates a longer eye relief in order to avoid vignetting and, in the extreme cases, to conserve the entire field of view. Binoculars with short eye relief can also be hard to use in instances where it is difficult to hold them steady.

Eyeglasses wearers who intend to wear their glasses when using binoculars should look for binoculars with an eye relief that is long enough so that their eyes are not behind the point of focus (also called the eyepoint). Else, their glasses will occupy the space where their eyes should be. Generally, an eye relief over 16 mm should be adequate for any eyeglass wearer. However, if glasses frames are thicker and so significantly protrude from the face, an eye relief over 17 mm should be considered. Eyeglasses wearers should also look for binoculars with twist-up eye cups that ideally have multiple settings, so they can be partially or fully retracted to adjust eye relief to individual ergonomic preferences.

=== Close focus distance ===
Close focus distance is the closest point that the binocular can focus on. This distance varies from about 0.5 to 30 m (2 to 98 ft), depending upon the design of the binoculars. If the close focus distance is short with respect to the magnification, the binocular can be used also to see particulars not visible to the naked eye.

=== Eyepieces ===
Binocular eyepieces usually consist of three or more lens elements in two or more groups. The lens furthest from the viewer's eye is called the field lens or objective lens and that closest to the eye the eye lens or ocular lens. The most common Kellner configuration is that invented in 1849 by Carl Kellner. In this arrangement, the eye lens is a plano-concave/ double convex achromatic doublet (the flat part of the former facing the eye) and the field lens is a double-convex singlet. A reversed Kellner eyepiece was developed in 1975 and in it the field lens is a double concave/ double convex achromatic doublet and the eye lens is a double convex singlet. The reverse Kellner provides 50% more eye relief and works better with small focal ratios as well as having a slightly wider field.

Wide field binoculars typically utilize some kind of Erfle configuration, patented in 1921. These have five or six elements in three groups. The groups may be two achromatic doublets with a double convex singlet between them or may all be achromatic doublets. These eyepieces tend not to perform as well as Kellner eyepieces at high power because they suffer from astigmatism and ghost images. However they have large eye lenses, excellent eye relief, and are comfortable to use at lower powers.

==== Field flattener lens ====
High-end binoculars often incorporate a field flattener lens in the eyepiece behind their prism configuration, designed to improve image sharpness and reduce image distortion at the outer regions of the field of view.

== Mechanical design ==
=== Focus and adjustment ===
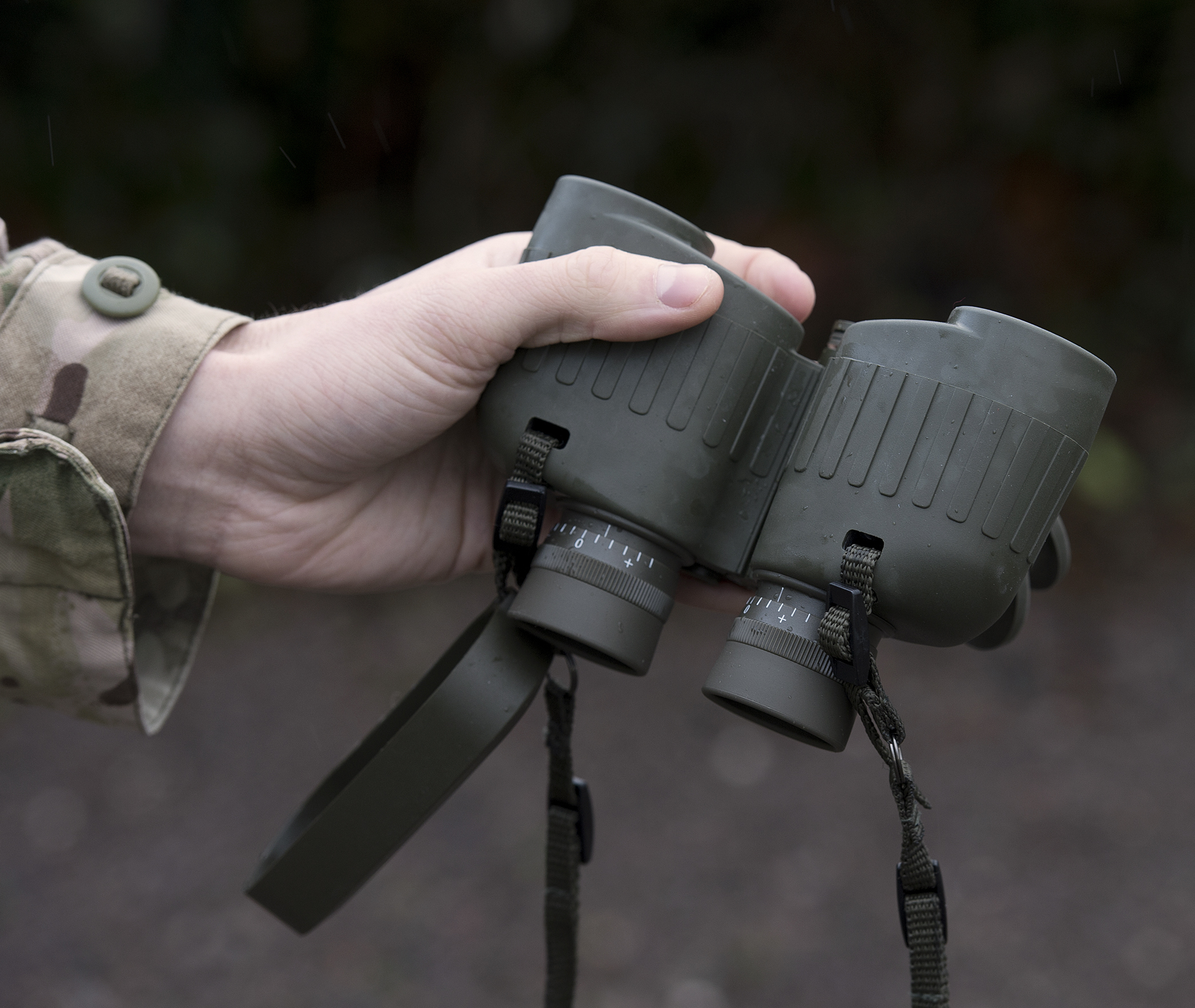
Independent focusing binoculars as used by the British military

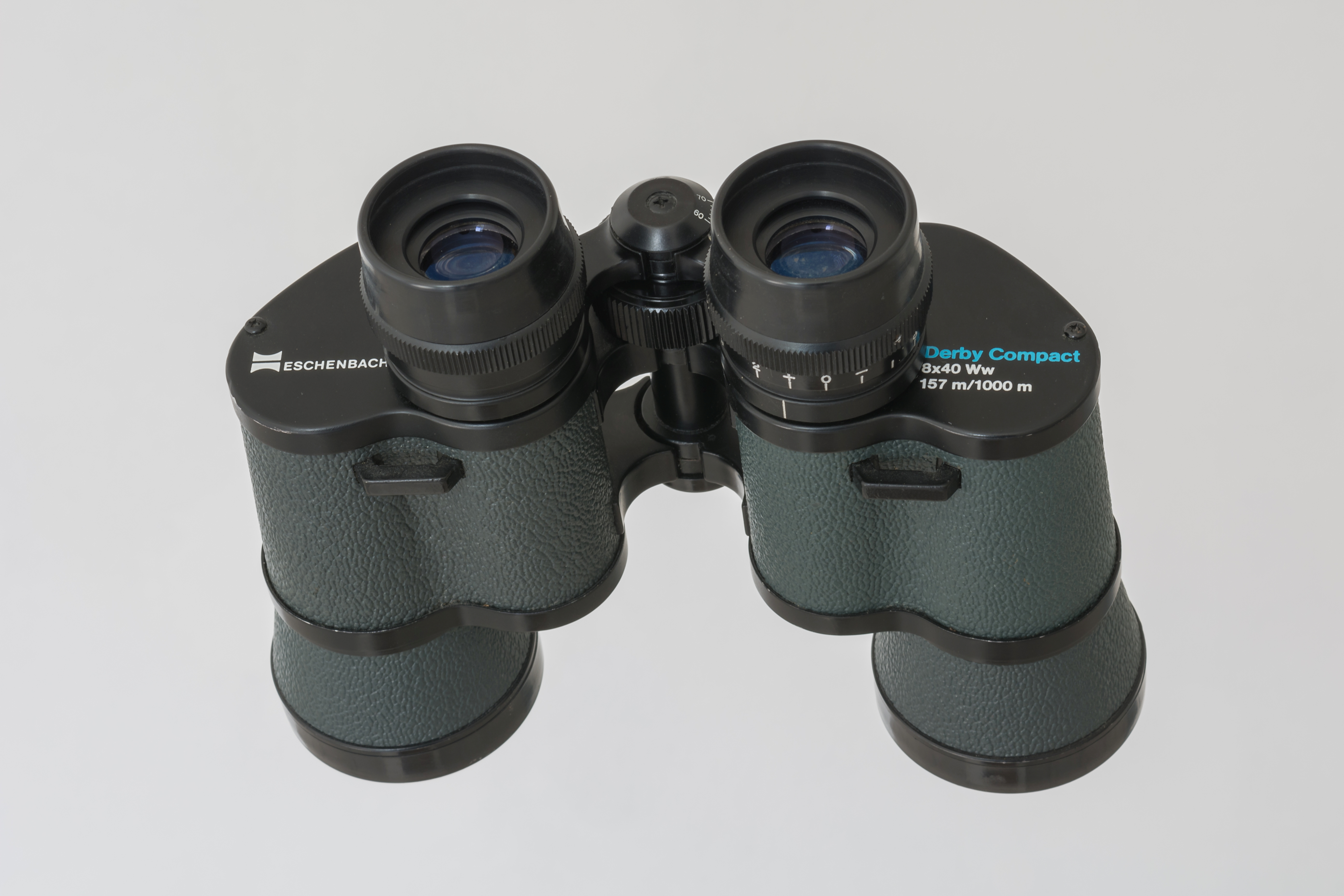
Porro type, external eyepiece bridge central-focusing binoculars with a rotating diopter on the right eyepiece allowing to adjust refractive differences between the viewer's left and right eyes

Binoculars have a focusing arrangement which changes the distance between eyepiece and objective lenses or internally mounted lens elements. Normally there are two different arrangements used to provide focus, "independent focus" and "central focusing":

- Independent focusing is an arrangement where the two telescope tubes are focused independently by adjusting each eyepiece. Binoculars designed for harsh environmental conditions and heavy field use, such as military or marine applications, traditionally have used independent focusing.
- Central focusing is an arrangement which involves rotation of a central focusing wheel to adjust both telescope tubes together. In addition, one of the two eyepieces can be further adjusted to compensate for differences between the viewer's eyes (usually by rotating the eyepiece in its mount). Because the focal change effected by the adjustable eyepiece can be measured in the customary unit of refractive power, the dioptre, the adjustable eyepiece itself is often called a dioptre. Once this adjustment has been made for a given viewer, the binoculars can be refocused on an object at a different distance by using the focusing wheel to adjust both tubes together without eyepiece readjustment.
  Central focusing binoculars can be further subdivided into:
  - External focusing, which focuses binoculars by moving the eyepieces, where the volume of the binoculars always changes. During this process, external air and also small dust particles and moisture can be drawn into or pressed out of the binoculars. It is hard to seal or waterproof such systems and in case the eyepieces are moved by a central focuser shaft and external eyepiece arms bridge construction, this construction can (accidentally) get bent/deformed that can result in disabling misalignment.
  - Internal focusing, which focuses binoculars by moving internal mounted optical lenses located between the objective lens group and the prism assembly – or rarely located between the prism assembly and eyepiece lens assembly – within the housing without changing the volume of the binoculars. The addition of a focusing lens reduces the light transmission of the optical system contained in the telescope tube somewhat. Internal focusing is generally considered the mechanically more robust central focusing solution and with the help of an appropriate seal like O-rings air and moisture ingress can be prevented, to make binoculars fully waterproof.

With increasing magnification, the depth of field – the distance between the nearest and the farthest objects that are in acceptably sharp focus in an image – decreases. The depth of field reduces quadratic with the magnification, so compared to 7× binoculars, 10× binoculars offer about half (7² ÷ 10² = 0.49) the depth of field. However, not related to the binoculars optical system, the user perceived practical depth of field or depth of acceptable view performance is also dependent on the accommodation ability (accommodation ability varies from person to person and decreases significantly with age) and light conditions dependent effective pupil size or diameter of the user's eyes. There are "focus-free" or "fixed-focus" binoculars that have no focusing mechanism other than the eyepiece adjustments that are meant to be set for the user's eyes and left fixed. These are considered to be compromise designs, suited for convenience, but not well suited for work that falls outside their designed hyperfocal distance range (for hand held binoculars generally from about 35 m (38 yd) to infinity without performing eyepiece adjustments for a given viewer).

Binoculars can be generally used without eyeglasses by myopic (near-sighted) or hyperopic (far-sighted) users simply by adjusting the focus a little farther. Most manufacturers leave a little extra available focal-range beyond the infinity-stop/setting to account for this when focusing for infinity. People with severe astigmatism, however, will still need to use their glasses while using binoculars.

Some binoculars have adjustable magnification, zoom binoculars, such as 7-21×50 intended to give the user the flexibility of having a single pair of binoculars with a wide range of magnifications, usually by moving a "zoom" lever. This is accomplished by a complex series of adjusting lenses similar to a zoom camera lens. These designs are noted to be a compromise and even a gimmick since they add bulk, complexity and fragility to the binocular. The complex optical path also leads to a narrow field of view and a large drop in brightness at high zoom. Models also have to match the magnification for both eyes throughout the zoom range and hold collimation to avoid eye strain and fatigue. These almost always perform much better at the low power setting than they do at the higher settings. This is natural, since the front objective cannot enlarge to let in more light as the power is increased, so the view gets dimmer. At 7×, the 50mm front objective provides a 7.14 mm exit pupil, but at 21×, the same front objective provides only a 2.38 mm exit pupil. Also, the optical quality of a zoom binocular at any given power is inferior to that of a fixed power binocular of that power.

=== Interpupillary distance ===
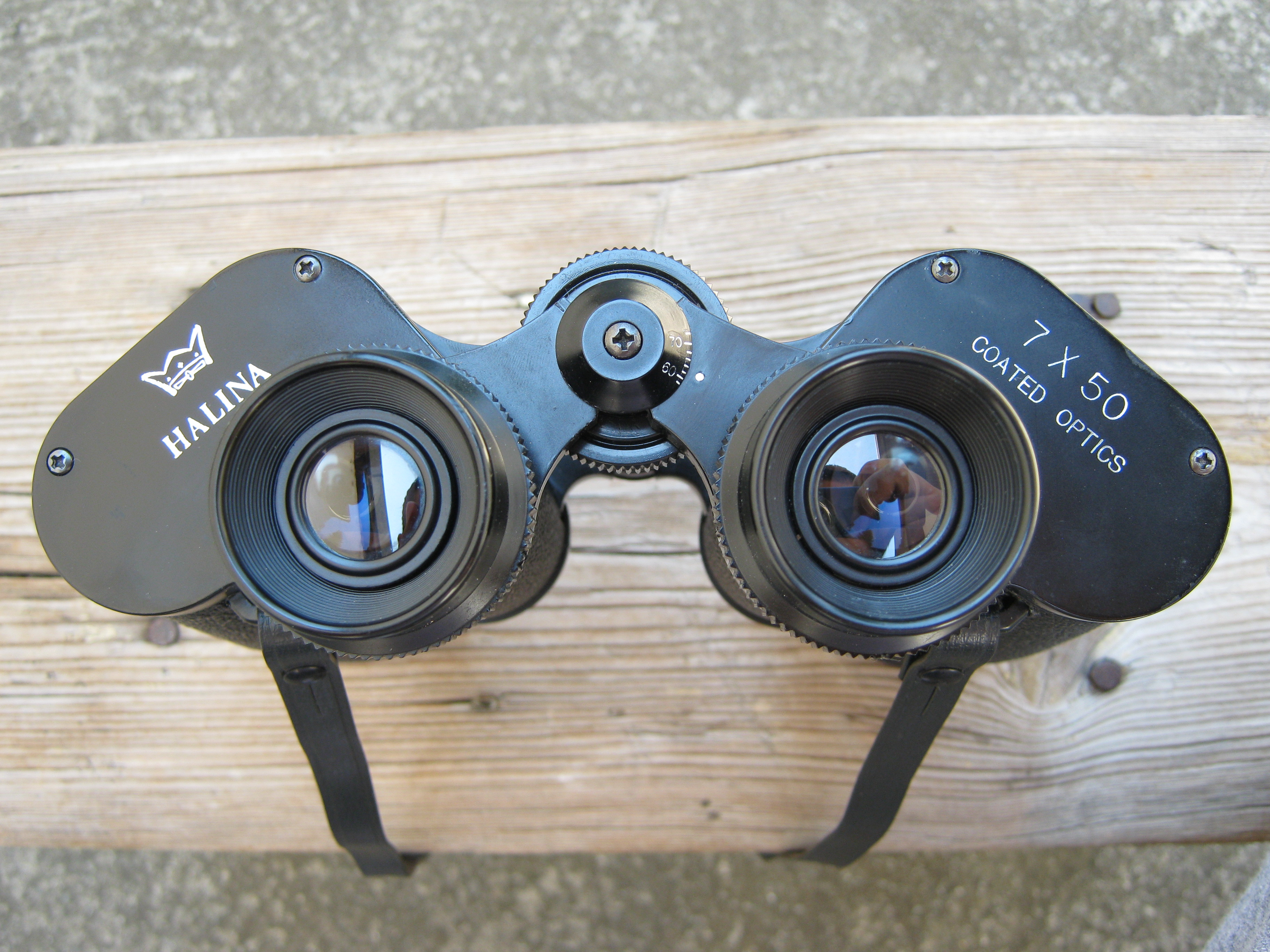
Binoculars with adjustable interpupillary distance set for about 63 mm

Most modern binoculars are also adjustable via a hinged construction that enables the distance between the two telescope halves to be adjusted to accommodate viewers with different eye separation or "interpupillary distance (IPD)" (the distance measured in millimeters between the centers of the pupils of the eyes). Most are optimized for the interpupillary distance (typically about 63 mm) for adults. Interpupillary distance varies with respect to age, gender and race. The binoculars industry has to take IPD variance (most adults have IPDs in the 50–75 mm range) and its extrema into account, because stereoscopic optical products need to be able to cope with many possible users, including those with the smallest and largest IPDs. Children and adults with narrow IPDs can experience problems with the IPD adjustment range of binocular barrels to match the width between the centers of the pupils in each eye impairing the use of some binoculars. Adults with average or wide IPDs generally experience no eye separation adjustment range problems, but straight barreled roof prism binoculars featuring over 60 mm diameter objectives can dimensionally be problematic to correctly adjust for adults with a relatively narrow IPDs. Anatomic conditions like hypertelorism and hypotelorism can affect IPD and due to extreme IPDs result in practical impairment of using stereoscopic optical products like binoculars.

=== Alignment ===
The two telescopes in binoculars are aligned in parallel (collimated), to produce a single circular, apparently three-dimensional, image. Misalignment will cause the binoculars to produce a double image. Even slight misalignment will cause vague discomfort and visual fatigue as the brain tries to combine the skewed images.

Alignment is performed by small movements to the prisms, by adjusting an internal support cell or by turning external set screws, or by adjusting the position of the objective via eccentric rings built into the objective cell. Unconditional aligning (3-axis collimation, meaning both optical axes are aligned parallel with the axis of the hinge used to select various interpupillary distance settings) binoculars requires specialized equipment. Unconditional alignment is usually done by a professional, although the externally mounted adjustment features can usually be accessed by the end user. Conditional alignment ignores the third axis (the hinge) in the alignment process. Such a conditional alignment comes down to a 2-axis pseudo-collimation and will only be serviceable within a small range of interpupillary distance settings, as conditional aligned binoculars are not collimated for the full interpupillary distance setting range.

=== Image stability ===
Some binoculars use image-stabilization technology to reduce shake at higher magnifications. This is done by having a gyroscope move part of the instrument, or by powered mechanisms driven by gyroscopic or inertial detectors, or via a mount designed to oppose and damp the effect of shaking movements. Stabilization may be enabled or disabled by the user as required. These techniques allow binoculars up to 20× to be hand-held, and much improve the image stability of lower-power instruments. There are some disadvantages: the image may not be quite as good as the best unstabilized binoculars when tripod-mounted, stabilized binoculars also tend to be more expensive and heavier than similarly specified non-stabilized binoculars.

=== Housing ===
Binoculars housings can be made of various structural materials. Old binoculars barrels and hinge bridges were often made of brass. Later steel and relatively light metals like aluminum and magnesium alloys were used, as well as polymers like (fibre-reinforced) polycarbonate and acrylonitrile butadiene styrene. The housing can be rubber armored externally as outer covering to provide a non-slip gripping surface, absorption of undesired sounds and additional cushioning/protection against dents, scrapes, bumps and minor impacts.

== Optical coatings ==
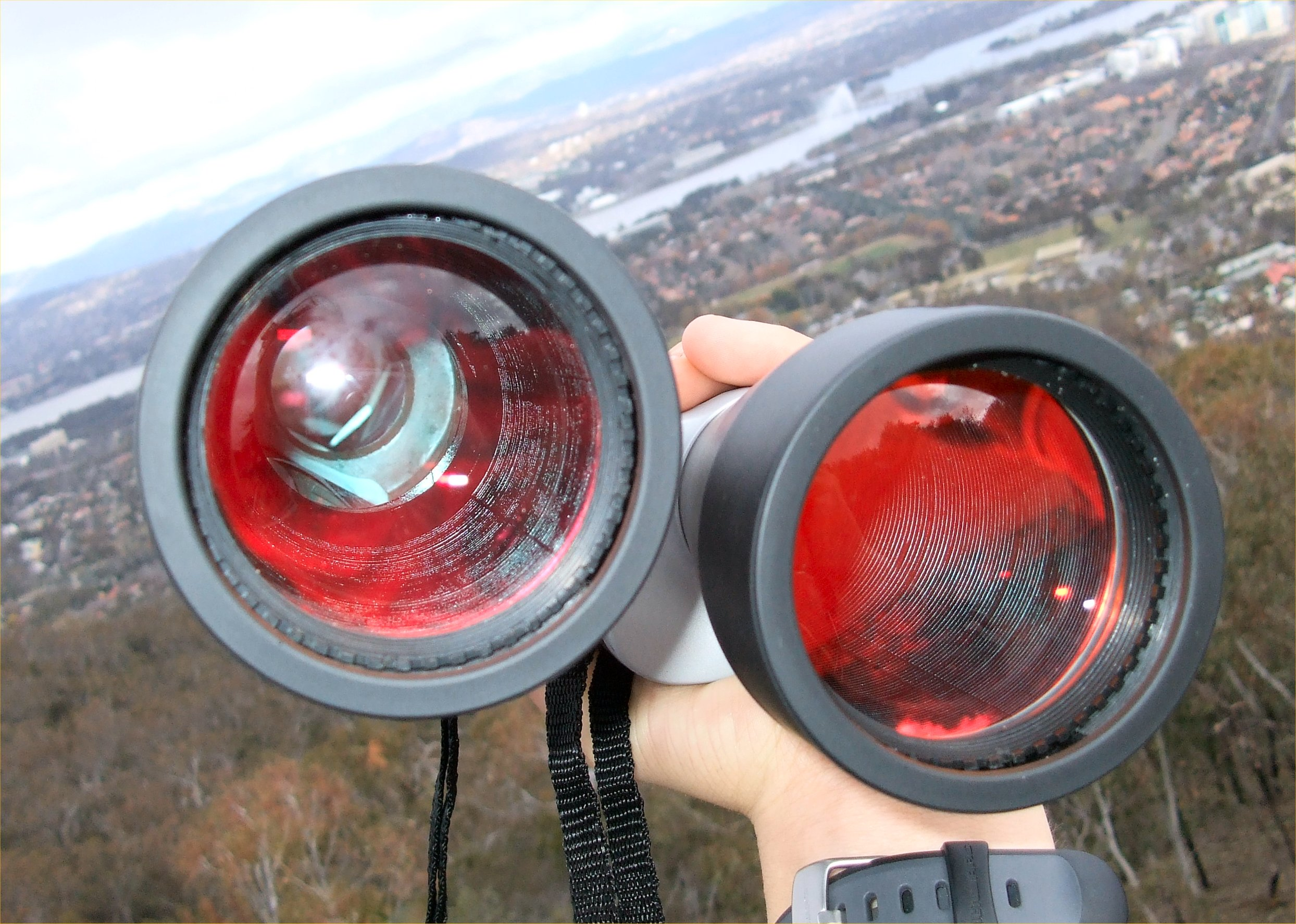
Binoculars with red-colored multicoatings. Sometimes they are fraudulently advertised as "infrared" binoculars.

Because a typical binocular has 6 to 10 optical elements with special characteristics and up to 20 atmosphere-to-glass surfaces, binocular manufacturers use different types of optical coatings for technical reasons and to improve the image they produce. Lens and prism optical coatings on binoculars can increase light transmission, minimize detrimental reflections and interference effects, optimize beneficial reflections, repel water and grease and even protect the lens from scratches. Modern optical coatings are composed of a combination of very thin layers of materials such as oxides, metals, or rare earth materials. The performance of an optical coating is dependent on the number of layers, manipulating their exact thickness and composition, and the refractive index difference between them. These coatings have become a key technology in the field of optics and manufacturers often have their own designations for their optical coatings. The various lens and prism optical coatings used in high-quality 21st century binoculars, when added together, can total about 200 (often superimposed) coating layers.

=== Anti-reflective ===
A quarter-wavelength (λ) thick anti-reflection coating, which leads to destructive interference

Anti-reflective interference coatings reduce light lost at every optical surface through reflection at each surface. Reducing reflection via anti-reflective coatings also reduces the amount of "lost" light present inside the binocular which would otherwise make the image appear hazy (low contrast). A pair of binoculars with good optical coatings may yield a brighter image than uncoated binoculars with a larger objective lens, on account of superior light transmission through the assembly. The first transparent interference-based coating Transparentbelag (T) used by Zeiss was invented in 1935 by Olexander Smakula. A classic lens-coating material is magnesium fluoride, which reduces reflected light from about 4% to 1.5%. At 16 atmosphere to optical glass surfaces passes, a 4% reflection loss theoretically means a 52% light transmission (0.96^{16} = 0.520) and a 1.5% reflection loss a much better 78.5% light transmission (0.985^{16} = 0.785). Reflection can be further reduced over a wider range of wavelengths and angles by using several superimposed layers with different refractive indices. The anti-reflective multi-coating Transparentbelag* (T*) used by Zeiss in the late 1970s consisted of six superimposed layers. In general, the outer coating layers have slightly lower index of refraction values and the layer thickness is adapted to the range of wavelengths in the visible spectrum to promote optimal destructive interference via reflection in the beams reflected from the interfaces, and constructive interference in the corresponding transmitted beams. There is no simple formula for the optimal layer thickness for a given choice of materials. These parameters are therefore determined with the help of simulation programs. Determined by the optical properties of the lenses used and intended primary use of the binoculars, different coatings are preferred, to optimize light transmission dictated by the human eye luminous efficiency function variance. Maximal light transmission around wavelengths of 555 nm (green) is important for obtaining optimal photopic vision using the eye cone cells for observation in well-lit conditions. Maximal light transmission around wavelengths of 498 nm (cyan) is important for obtaining optimal scotopic vision using the eye rod cells for observation in low light conditions. As a result, effective modern anti-reflective lens coatings consist of complex multi-layers and reflect only 0.25% or less to yield an image with maximum brightness and natural colors. These allow high-quality 21st century binoculars to practically achieve at the eye lens or ocular lens measured over 90% light transmission values in low light conditions. Depending on the coating, the character of the image seen in the binoculars under normal daylight can either look "warmer" or "colder" and appear either with higher or lower contrast. Subject to the application, the coating is also optimized for maximum color fidelity through the visible spectrum, for example in the case of lenses specially designed for bird watching. A common application technique is physical vapor deposition of one or more superimposed anti-reflective coating layer(s) which includes evaporative deposition, making it a complex production process.

=== Phase correction ===
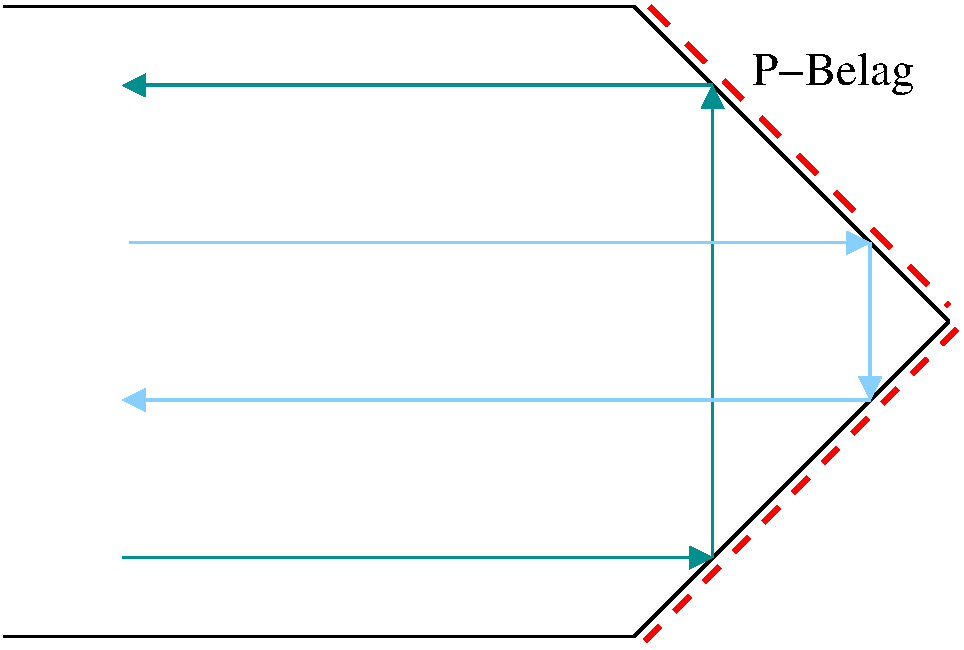
Beam path at the roof edge (cross-section); the P-coating layer is on both roof surfaces

In binoculars with roof prisms the light path is split into two paths that reflect on either side of the roof prism ridge. One half of the light reflects from roof surface 1 to roof surface 2. The other half of the light reflects from roof surface 2 to roof surface 1. If the roof faces are uncoated, the mechanism of reflection is Total Internal Reflection (TIR). In TIR, light polarized in the plane of incidence (p-polarized) and light polarized orthogonal to the plane of incidence (s-polarized) experience different phase shifts. As a consequence, linearly polarized light emerges from a roof prism elliptically polarized. Furthermore, the state of elliptical polarization of the two paths through the prism is different. When the two paths recombine on the retina (or a detector) there is interference between light from the two paths causing a distortion of the Point Spread Function and a deterioration of the image. Resolution and contrast significantly suffer. These unwanted interference effects can be suppressed by vapor depositing a special dielectric coating known as a phase-correction coating or P-coating on the roof surfaces of the roof prism. To approximately correct a roof prism for polychromatic light several phase-correction coating layers are superimposed, since every layer is wavelength and angle of incidence specific. The P-coating was developed in 1988 by Adolf Weyrauch at Carl Zeiss. Other manufacturers followed soon, and since then phase-correction coatings are used across the board in medium and high-quality roof prism binoculars. This coating suppresses the difference in phase shift between s- and p- polarization so both paths have the same polarization and no interference degrades the image. In this way, since the 1990s, roof prism binoculars have also achieved resolution values that were previously only achievable with Porro prisms. The presence of a phase-correction coating can be checked on unopened binoculars using two polarization filters. Dielectric phase-correction prism coatings are applied in a vacuum chamber with maybe thirty or more different superimposed vapor coating layers deposits, making it a complex production process.

Binoculars using either a Schmidt–Pechan roof prism, Abbe–Koenig roof prism or an Uppendahl roof prism benefit from phase coatings that compensate for a loss of resolution and contrast caused by the interference effects that occur in untreated roof prisms. Porro prism and Perger prism binoculars do not split beams and therefore they do not require any phase coatings.

=== Metallic mirror ===
In binoculars with Schmidt–Pechan or Uppendahl roof prisms, mirror coatings are added to some surfaces of the roof prism because the light is incident at one of the prism's glass-air boundaries at an angle less than the critical angle so total internal reflection does not occur. Without a mirror coating most of that light would be lost. Roof prism aluminum mirror coating (reflectivity of 87% to 93%) or silver mirror coating (reflectivity of 95% to 98%) is used.

In older designs silver mirror coatings were used but these coatings oxidized and lost reflectivity over time in unsealed binoculars. Aluminum mirror coatings were used in later unsealed designs because they did not tarnish even though they have a lower reflectivity than silver. Using vacuum-vaporization technology, modern designs use either aluminum, enhanced aluminum (consisting of aluminum overcoated with a multilayer dielectric film) or silver. Silver is used in modern high-quality designs which are sealed and filled with nitrogen or argon to provide an inert atmosphere so that the silver mirror coating does not tarnish.

Porro prism and Perger prism binoculars and roof prism binoculars using the Abbe–Koenig roof prism configuration do not use mirror coatings because these prisms reflect with 100% reflectivity using total internal reflection in the prism rather than requiring a (metallic) mirror coating.

=== Dielectric mirror ===
Diagram of a dielectric mirror. Thin layers with a high refractive index n_{1} are interleaved with thicker layers with a lower refractive index n_{2}. The path lengths l_{A} and l_{B} differ by exactly one wavelength, which leads to constructive interference.

Dielectric coatings are used in Schmidt–Pechan and Uppendahl roof prisms to cause the prism surfaces to act as a dielectric mirror. This coating was introduced in 2004 in Zeiss Victory FL binoculars featuring Schmidt–Pechan prisms. Other manufacturers followed soon, and since then dielectric coatings are used across the board in medium and high-quality Schmidt–Pechan and Uppendahl roof prism binoculars. The non-metallic dielectric reflective coating is formed from several multilayers of alternating high and low refractive index materials deposited on a prism's reflective surfaces. The manufacturing techniques for dielectric mirrors are based on thin-film deposition methods. A common application technique is physical vapor deposition which includes evaporative deposition with maybe seventy or more different superimposed vapor coating layers deposits, making it a complex production process. This multilayer coating increases reflectivity from the prism surfaces by acting as a distributed Bragg reflector. A well-designed multilayer dielectric coating can provide a reflectivity of over 99% across the visible light spectrum. This reflectivity is an improvement compared to either an aluminium mirror coating or silver mirror coating.

Porro prism and Perger prism binoculars and roof prism binoculars using the Abbe–Koenig roof prism do not use dielectric coatings because these prisms reflect with 100% reflectivity using total internal reflection in the prism rather than requiring a (dielectric) mirror coating.

=== Terms ===
==== All binoculars ====
The presence of any coatings is typically denoted on binoculars by the following terms:

- coated optics: one or more surfaces are anti-reflective coated with a single-layer coating.
- fully coated: all air-to-glass surfaces are anti-reflective coated with a single-layer coating. Plastic lenses, however, if used, may not be coated.
- multi-coated: one or more surfaces have anti-reflective multi-layer coatings.
- fully multi-coated: all air-to-glass surfaces are anti-reflective multi-layer coated.

The presence of optical high transmittance crown glass offering relatively low refractive index (≈1.52) and low dispersion (with Abbe numbers around 60) is typically denoted on binoculars by the following terms:

- BK7 (Schott designates it as 517642. The first three digits designate its refractive index [1.517] and the last three designate its Abbe number [64.2]. Its critical angle is 41.2°.)
- BaK4 (Schott designates it as 569560. The first three digits designate its refractive index [1.569] and the last three designate its Abbe number [56.0]. Its critical angle is 39.6°.)

==== Roof prisms only ====
- phase-coated or P-coating: the roof prism has a phase-correcting coating
- aluminium-coated: the roof prism mirrors are coated with an aluminium coating (the default if a mirror coating isn't mentioned).
- silver-coated: the roof prism mirrors are coated with a silver coating
- dielectric-coated: the roof prism mirrors are coated with a dielectric coating

== Accessories ==
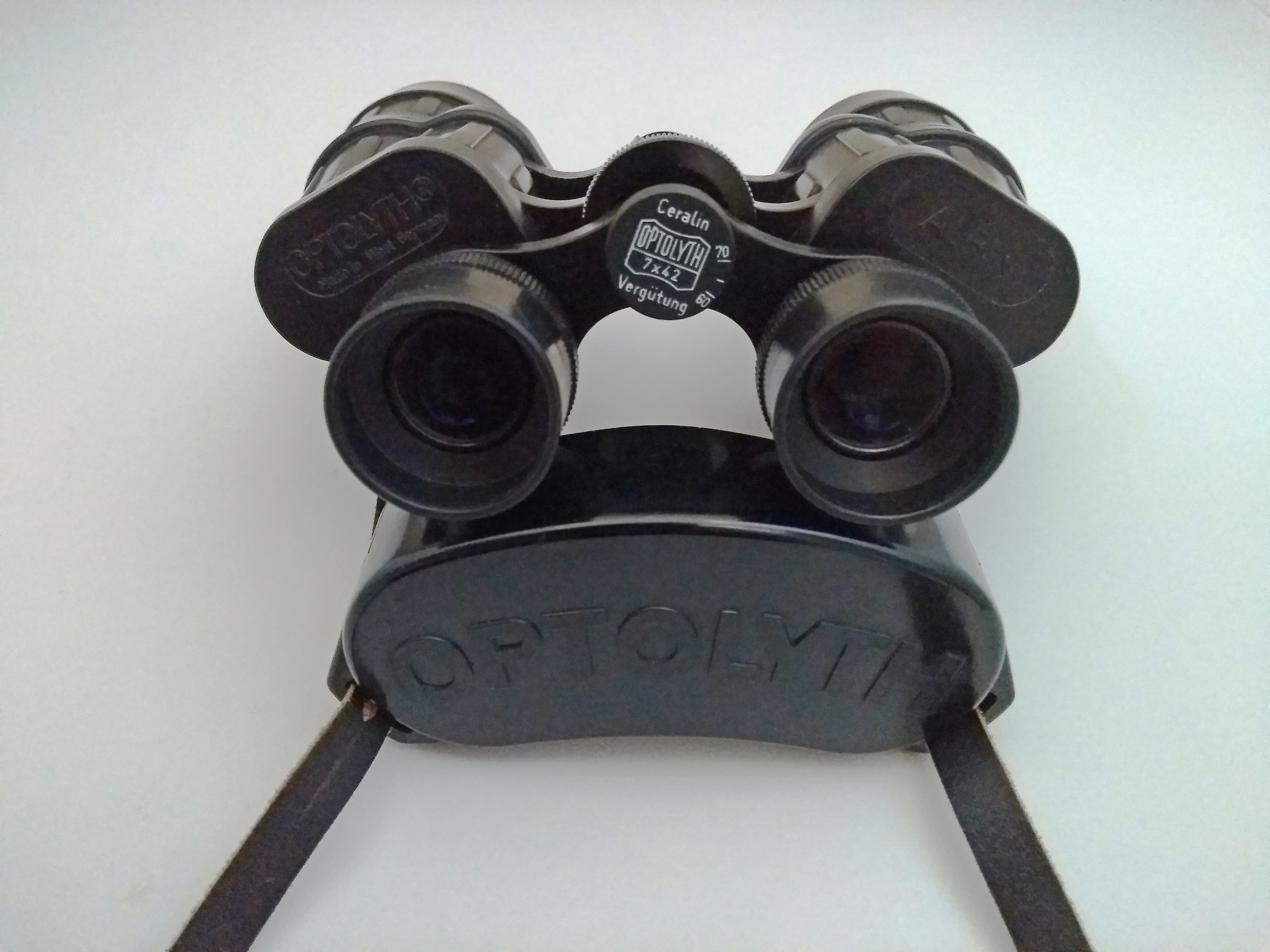
Binoculars with eyepieces resting on a rainguard all connected by a neck strap

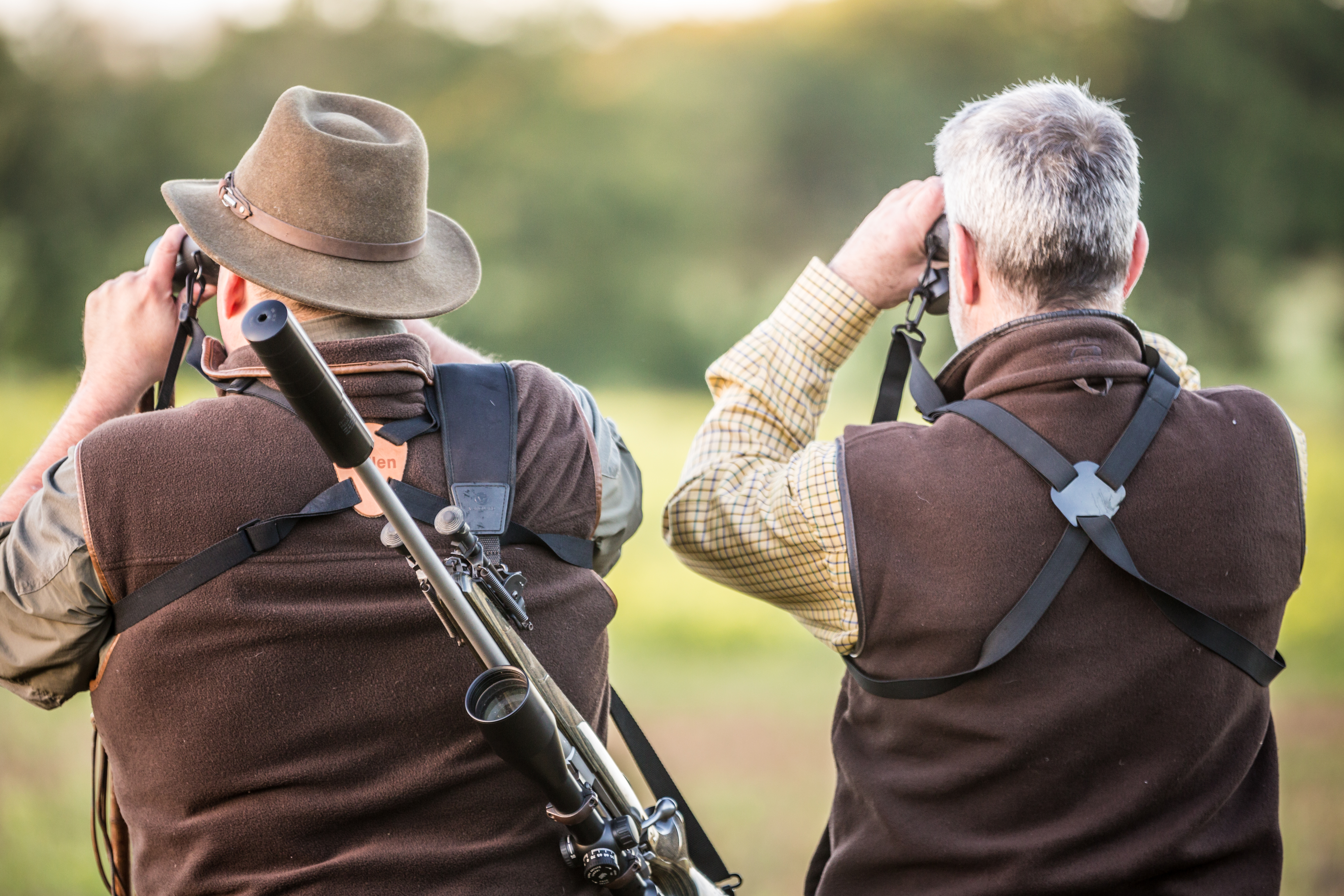
Deer hunters using binoculars harnesses suitable for prolonged carrying

Common accessories for binoculars are:

- neck and shoulder straps for carrying
- binocular harnesses (sometimes combined with an integrated field case) to distribute weight evenly for prolonged carrying
- field carrying cases/side bags
- binoculars storage/travel cases
- rainguards for protecting the eyepieces outer lenses
- (tethered) lens caps for protecting the objectives outer lenses
- cleaning kits to carefully remove dirt from lenses and other surfaces
- tripod adapters

== Applications ==
=== General use ===
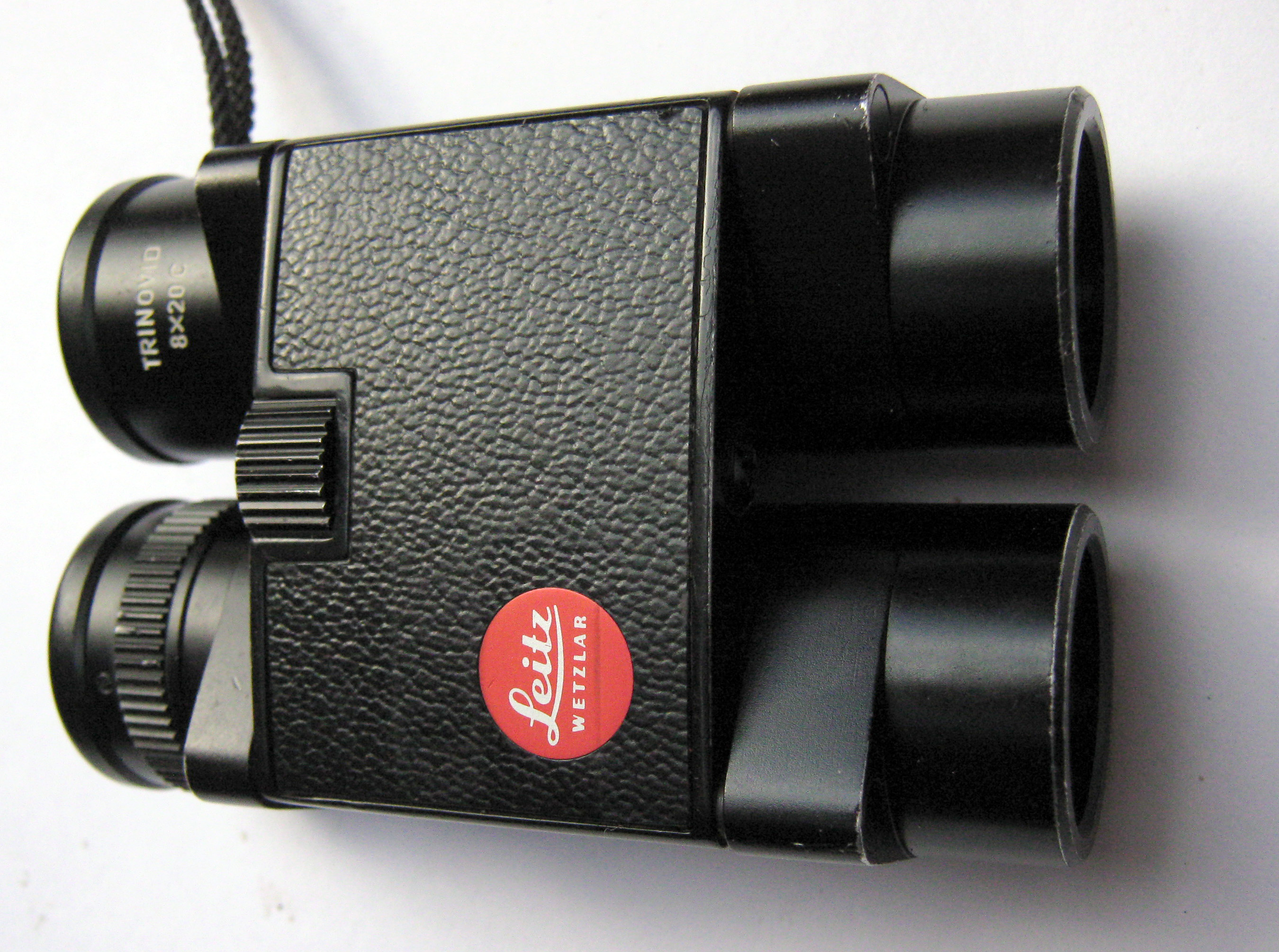
Trinovid 8×20 C folded for storage

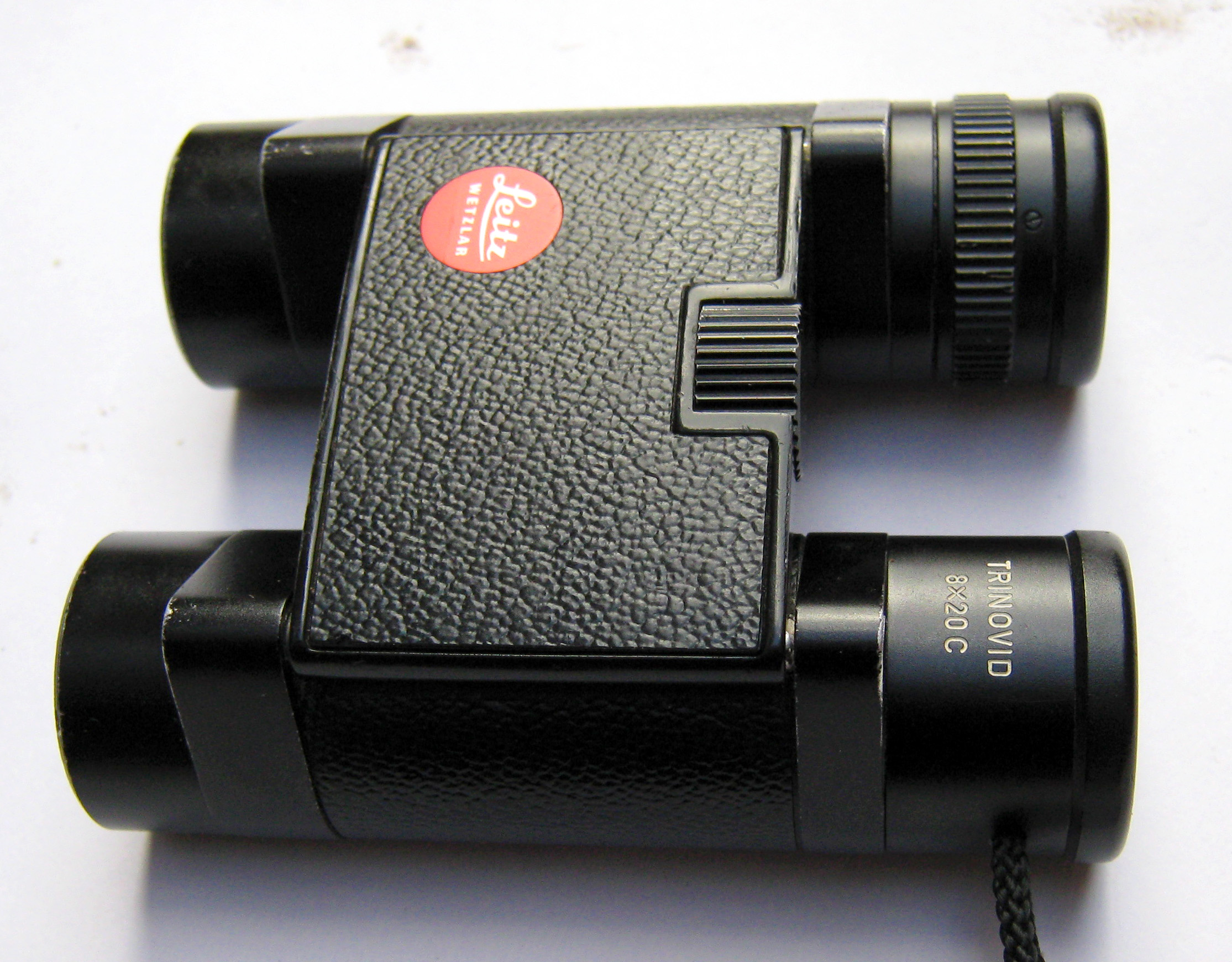
Trinovid 8×20 C expanded for use

Compact binoculars with double bridge

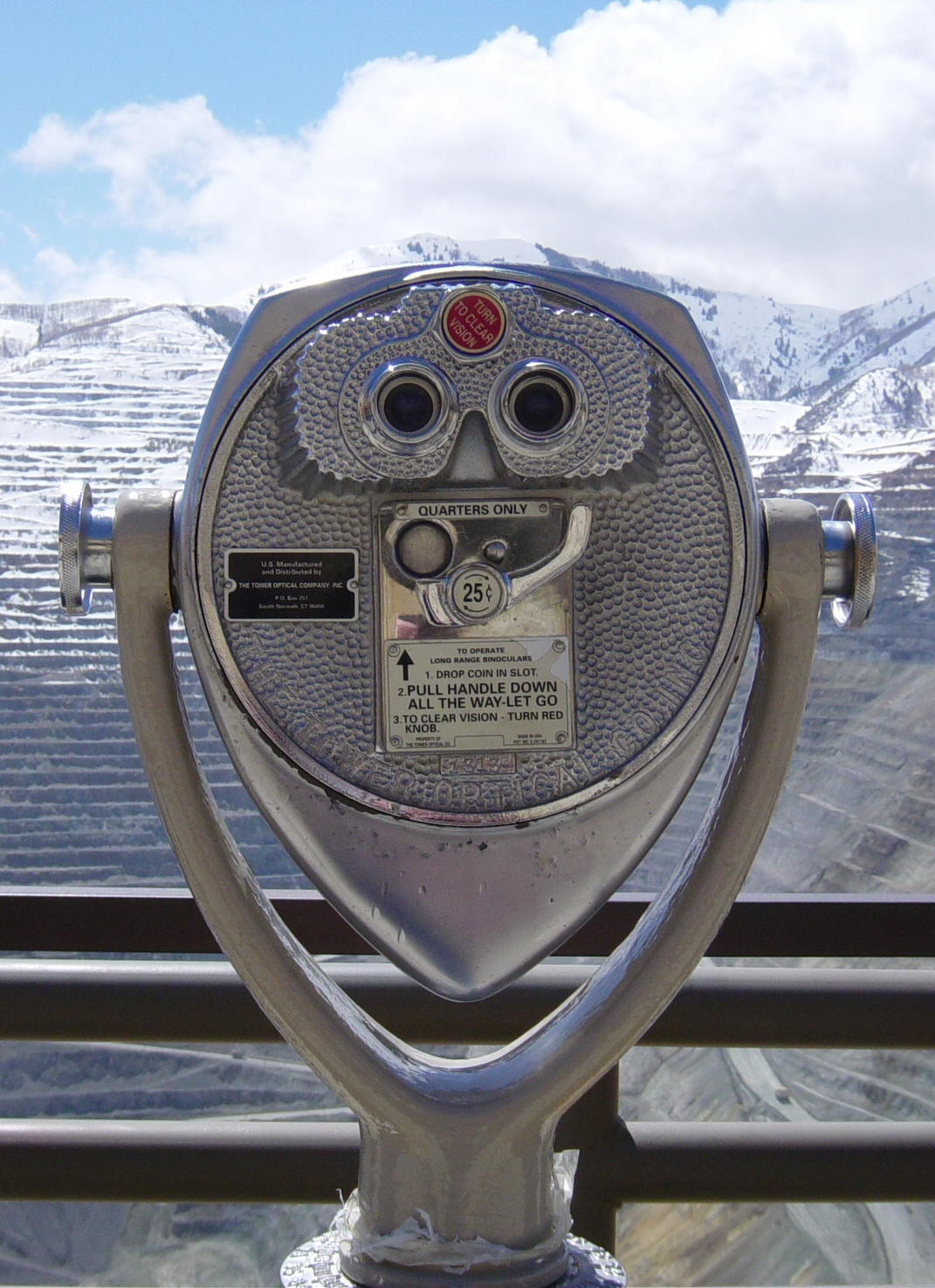
Tower Optical coin-operated binocular tower viewers

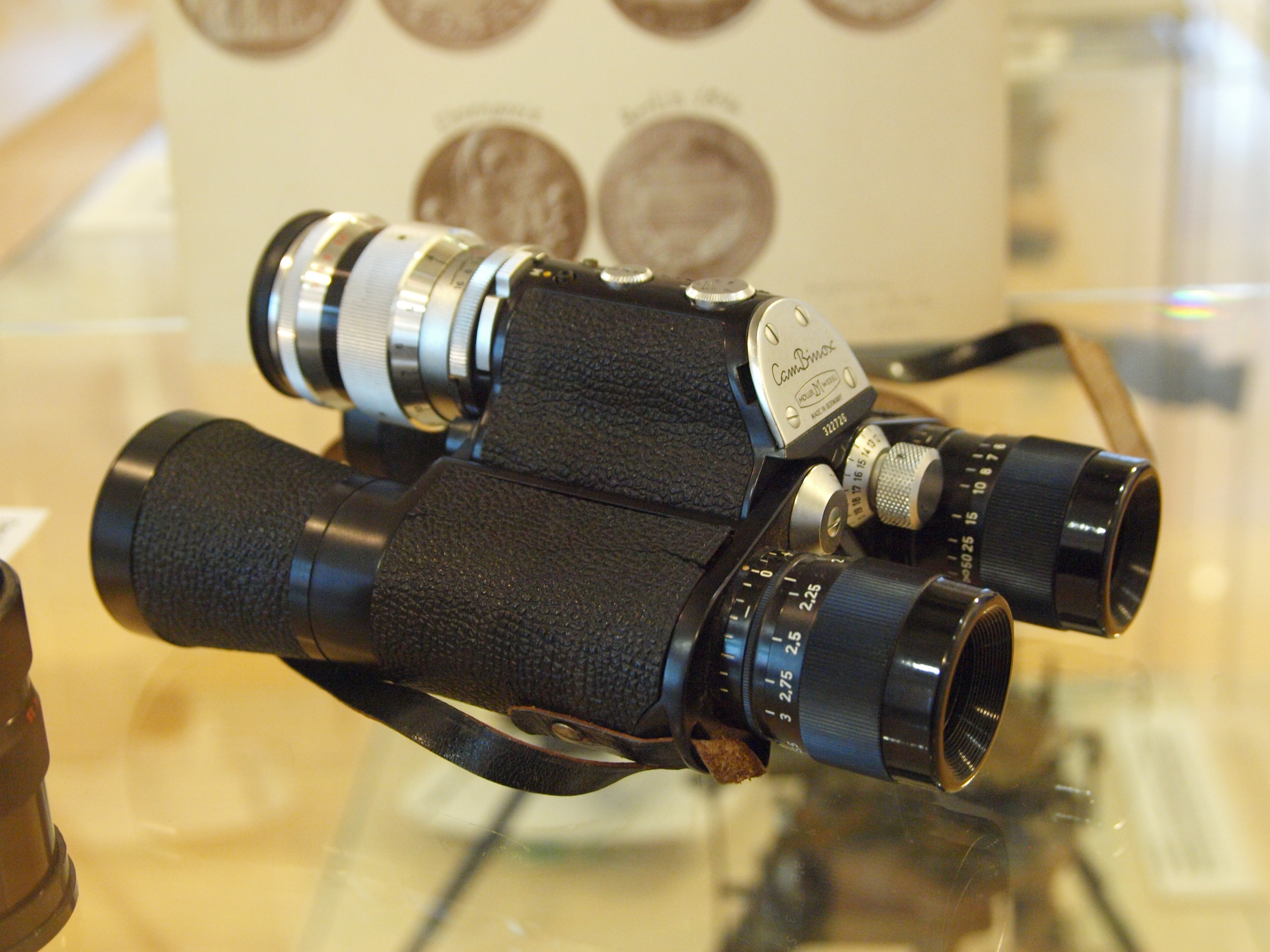
Möller-Wedel CamBinox

Hand-held binoculars range from small 3 × 10 Galilean opera glasses, used in theaters, to glasses with 7 to 12 times magnification and 30 to 50 mm diameter objectives for typical outdoor use.

Compact or pocket binoculars are small light binoculars suitable for daytime use. Most compact binoculars feature magnifications of 7× to 10×, and objective diameter sizes of a relatively modest 20 mm to 25 mm, resulting in small exit pupil sizes limiting low light suitability. Roof prism designs tend to be narrower and more compact than equivalent Porro prism designs. Thus, compact binoculars are mostly roof prism designs. The telescope tubes of compact binoculars can often be folded closely to each other to radically reduce the binocular's volume when not in use, for easy carriage and storage.

Many tourist attractions have installed pedestal-mounted, coin-operated binocular tower viewers to allow visitors to obtain a closer view of the attraction.

=== Land surveys and geographic data collection ===
Although technology has surpassed using binoculars for data collection, historically these were advanced tools used by geographers and other geoscientists. Even today, field glasses can provide visual aid when surveying large areas.

=== Bird watching ===
Birdwatching is a very popular hobby among nature and animal lovers; a binocular is their most basic tool because most human eyes cannot resolve sufficient detail to fully appreciate and/or study small birds. To be able to view birds in flight well rapid moving objects acquiring capability and depth of field are important. Typically, binoculars with a magnification of 8× to 10× are used, though many manufacturers produce models with 7× magnification for a wider field of view and increased depth of field. The other main consideration for birdwatching binoculars is the size of the objective that collects light. A larger (e.g. 40–45mm) objective works better in low light and for seeing into foliage, but also makes for a heavier binocular than a 30–35mm objective. Weight may not seem a primary consideration when first hefting a pair of binoculars, but birdwatching involves a lot of holding up the binoculars while standing in one place.

=== Hunting ===
Hunters commonly use binoculars in the field as a way to observe distant game animals. Hunters most commonly use about 8× magnification binoculars with 40–45mm objectives to be able to find and observe game in low light conditions. European manufacturers produced and produce 7×42 binoculars with good low light performance without getting too bulky for mobile use like extended carrying/stalking and much bigger bulky 8×56 and 9×63 low-light binoculars optically optimized for excellent low light performance for more stationary hunting at dusk and night. For hunting binoculars optimized for observation in twilight, coatings are preferred that maximize light transmission in the wavelength range around 460-540 nm.

=== Range finding ===
Some binoculars have a range finding reticle (scale) superimposed upon the view. This scale allows the distance to the object to be estimated if the object's height is known (or estimable). The common mariner 7×50 binoculars have these scales with the angle between marks equal to 5 mil. One mil is equivalent to the angle between the top and bottom of an object one meter in height at a distance of 1000 meters.

Therefore, to estimate the distance to an object that is a known height the formula is:

$$D = \frac{OH}{\text{Mil}}\times 1000$$

where:

- $D$ is the Distance to the object in meters.
- $OH$ is the known Object Height.
- $\text{Mil}$ is the angular height of the object in number of Mil.

With the typical 5 mil scale (each mark is 5 mil), a lighthouse that is 3 marks high and known to be 120 meters tall is 8000 meters distant.

$$8000 \text{m} = \frac{120 \text{m}}{15 \text{mil}} \times 1000$$

=== Military ===
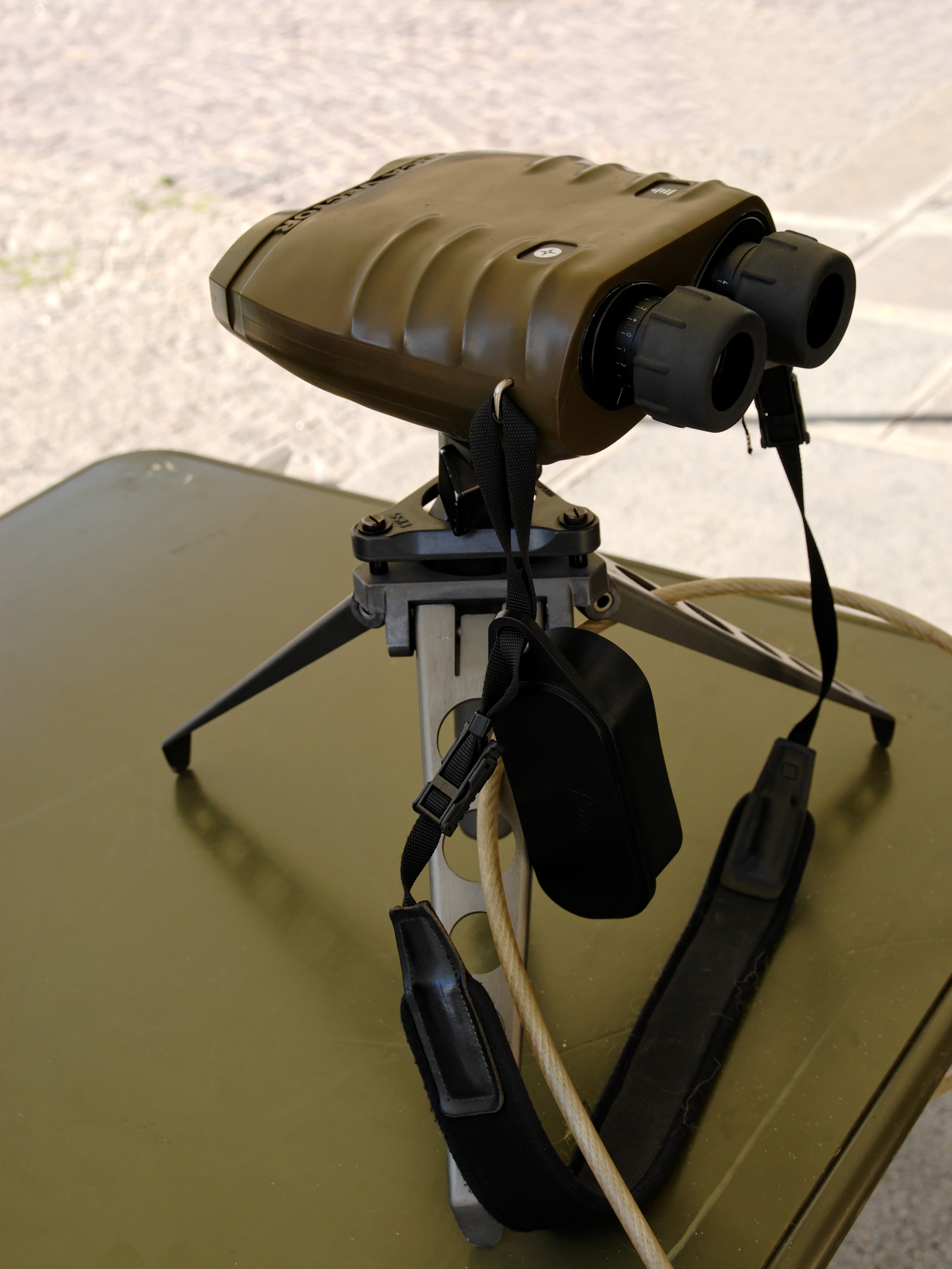
Vector series laser rangefinder 7×42 binoculars can measure distance and angles and also features a 360° digital compass and class 1 eye safe filters

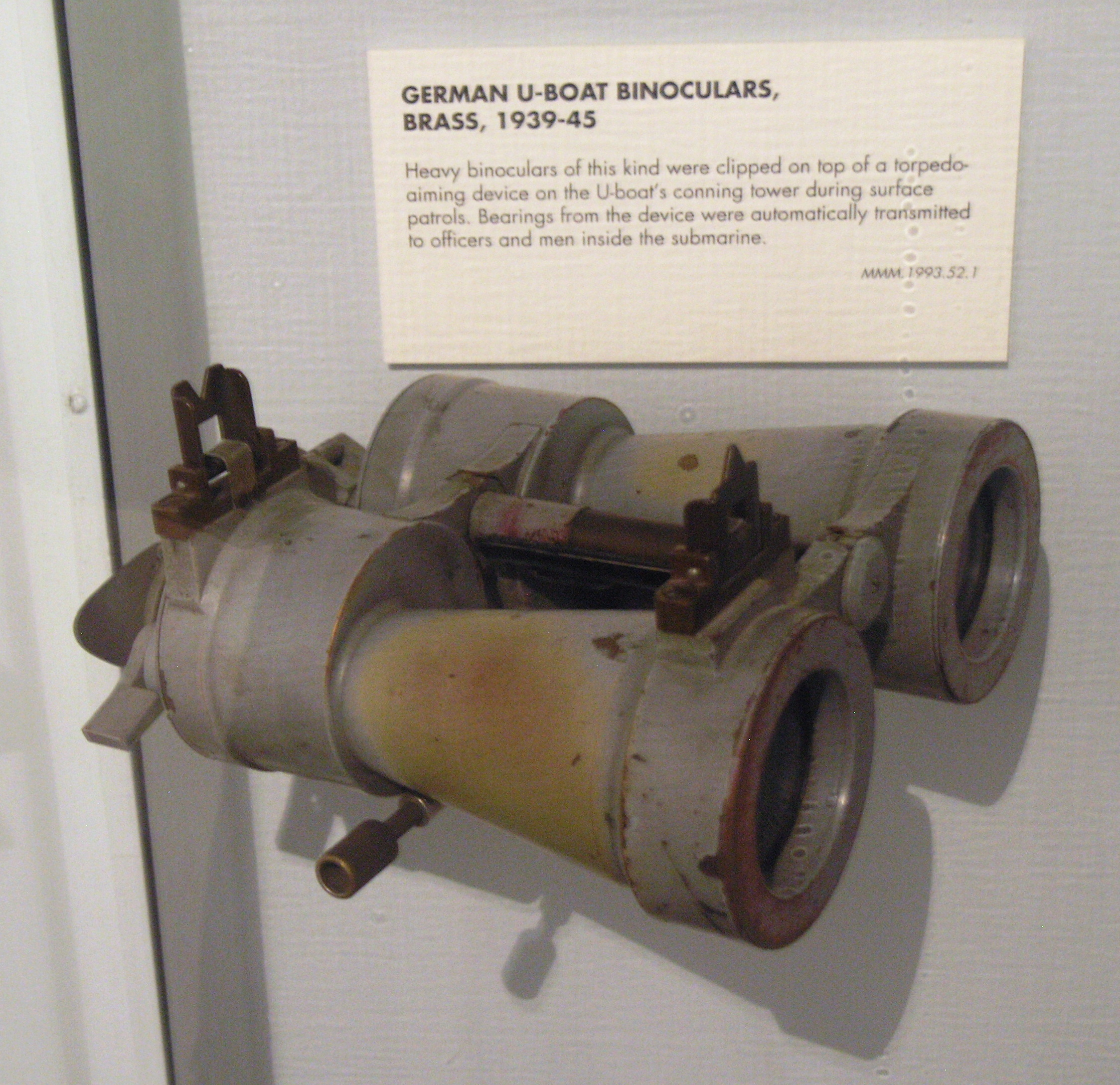
German U.D.F. 7×50 blc U-boat binoculars (1939–1945)

Binoculars have a long history of military use. Galilean designs were widely used up to the end of the 19th century when they gave way to porro prism types. Binoculars constructed for general military use tend to be more rugged than their civilian counterparts. They generally avoid fragile center focus arrangements in favor of independent focus, which also makes for easier, more effective weatherproofing. Prism sets in military binoculars may have redundant aluminized coatings on their prism sets to guarantee they do not lose their reflective qualities if they get wet.

One variant form was called "trench binoculars", a combination of binoculars and periscope, often used for artillery spotting purposes. It projected only a few inches above the parapet, thus keeping the viewer's head safely in the trench.

Military binoculars can and were also used as measuring and aiming devices, and can feature filters and (illuminated) reticles.

Military binoculars of the Cold War era were sometimes fitted with passive sensors that detected active IR emissions, while modern ones usually are fitted with filters blocking laser beams used as weapons. Further, binoculars designed for military usage may include a stadiametric reticle in one eyepiece in order to facilitate range estimation. Modern binoculars designed for military usage can also feature laser rangefinders, compasses, and data exchange interfaces to send measurements to other peripheral devices.

Very large binocular naval rangefinders (up to 15 meters separation of the two objective lenses, weight 10 tons, for ranging World War II naval gun targets 25 km away) have been used, although late-20th century radar and laser range finding technology made this application mostly redundant.

=== Marine ===
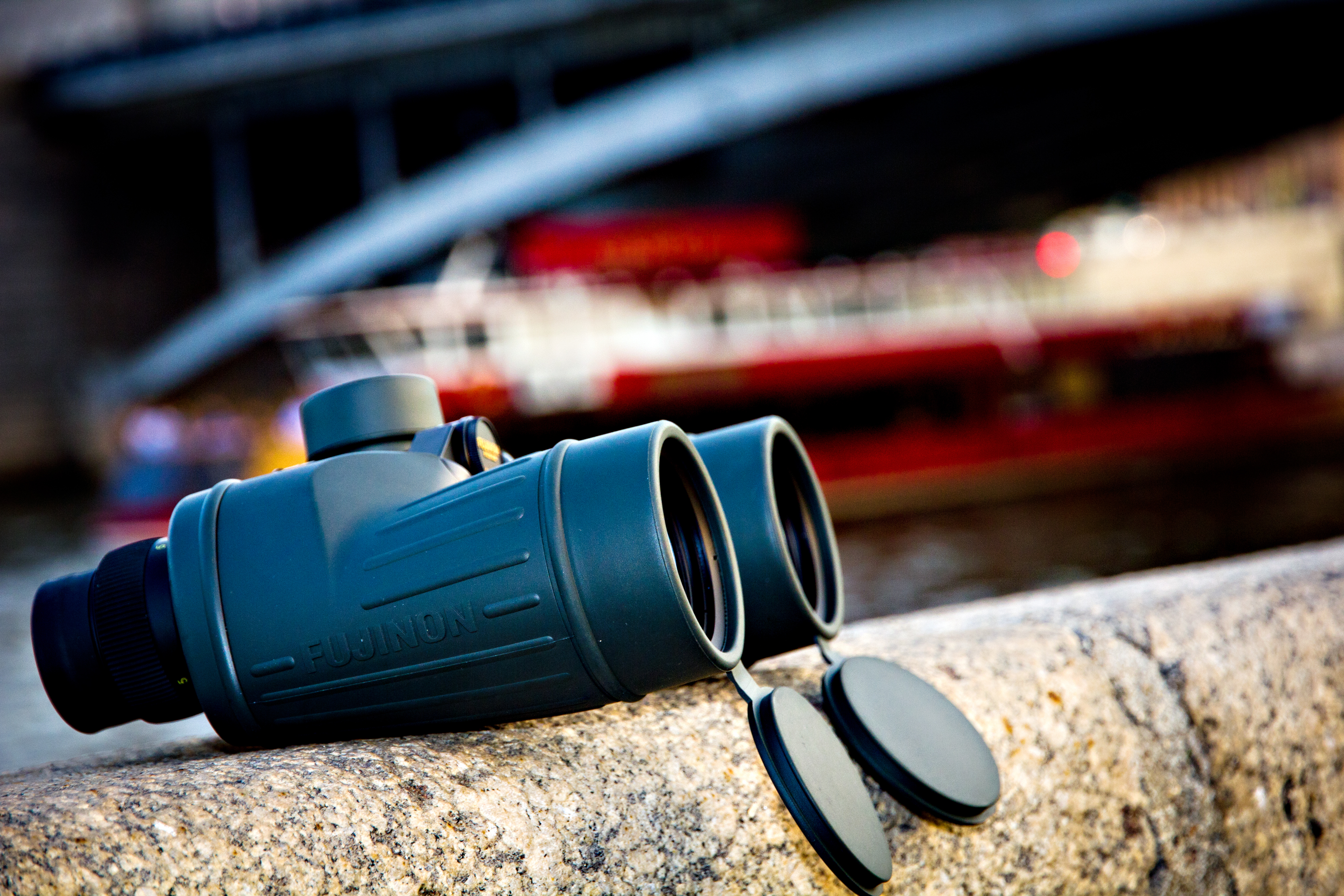
7×50 marine binoculars with damped compass

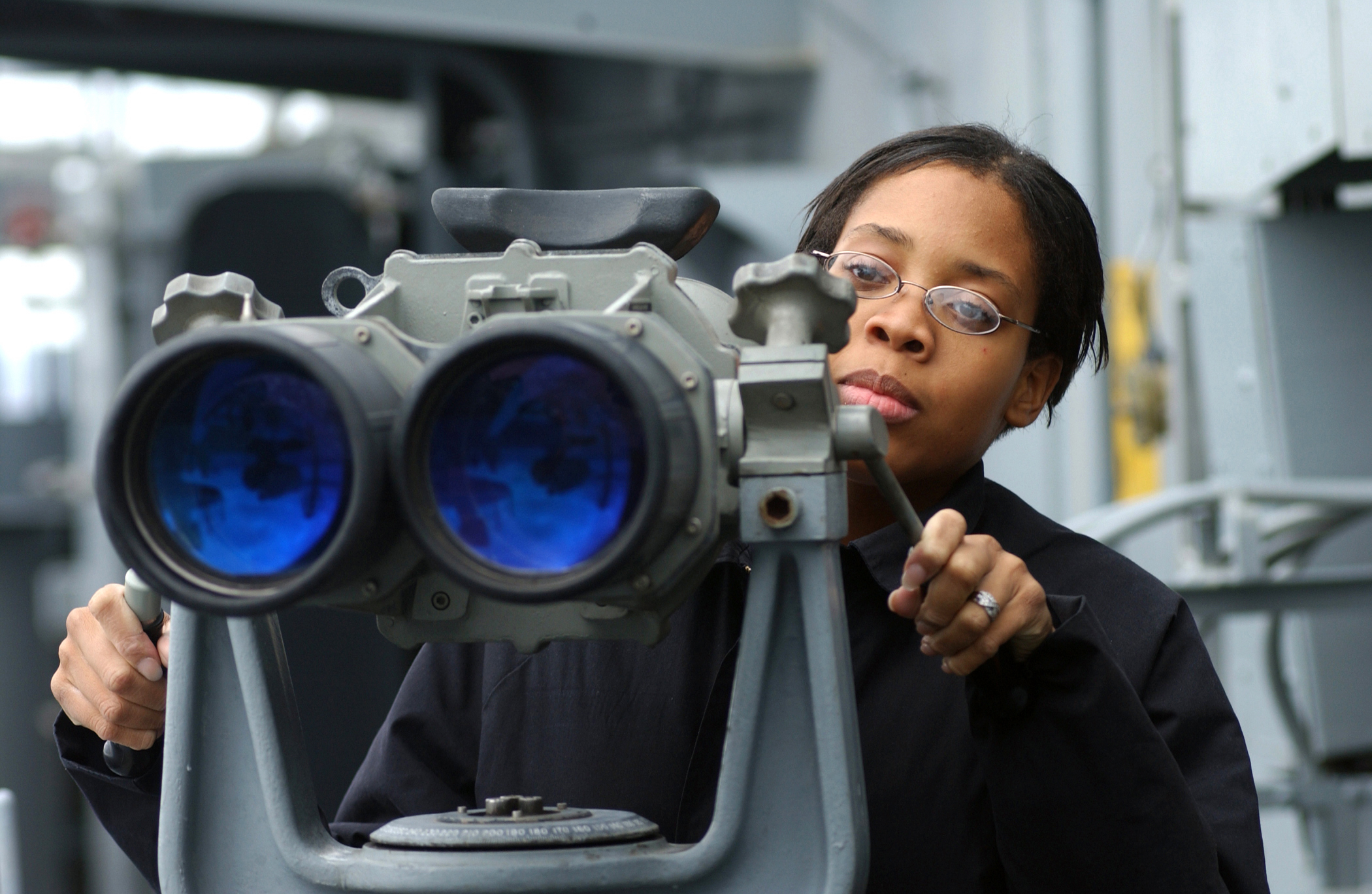
US Naval ship 'Big eyes' 20×120 binoculars in fixed mounting

There are binoculars designed specifically for civilian and military use under harsh environmental conditions at sea. Hand held models will be 5× to 8× magnification, but with very large prism sets combined with eyepieces designed to give generous eye relief. This optical combination prevents the image vignetting or going dark when the binoculars are pitching and vibrating relative to the viewer's eyes due to a vessel's motion.

Marine binoculars often contain one or more features to aid in navigation on ships and boats.

Hand held marine binoculars typically feature:

- Sealed interior: O-rings or other seals prevent air and moisture ingress.
- Nitrogen or argon filled interior: the interior is filled with 'dry' gas to prevent internal fogging/tarnishing of the optical surfaces. As fungi can not grow in the presence of an inert or noble gas atmosphere, it also prevents lens fungus formation.
- Independent focusing: this method aids in providing a durable, sealed interior.
- Reticle scale: a navigational aid which uses a horizon line and a vertical scale for measuring the distance of objects of known width or height – sometimes an important navigational aid.
- Compass: A compass bearing projected in the image. Damping helps to read the compass bearing on a moving ship or boat.
- Floating strap: some marine binoculars float on water, to prevent sinking. Marine binoculars that do not float are sometime supplied with or provided by the user as an aftermarket accessory with a strap that will function as a flotation device.

Mariners also often deem an adequate low light performance of the optical combination important, explaining the many 7×50 hand held marine binoculars offerings featuring a large 7.14 mm exit pupil, which corresponds to the average pupil size of a youthful dark-adapted human eye in circumstances with no extraneous light.

Civilian and military ships can also use large, high-magnification binocular models with large objectives in fixed mountings.

=== Astronomical ===
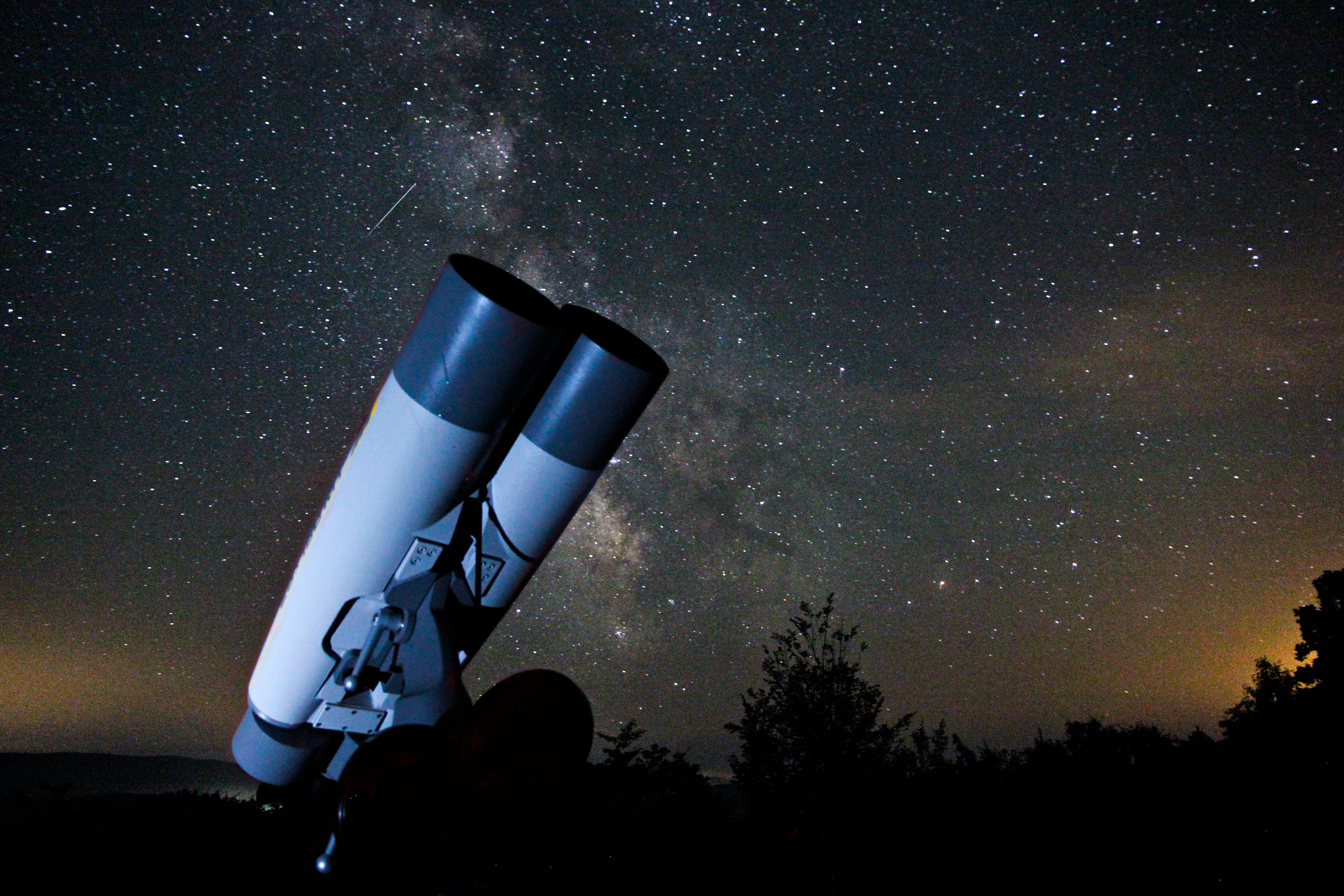
25 × 150 binoculars adapted for astronomical use

Binoculars are widely used by amateur astronomers; their wide field of view makes them useful for comet and supernova seeking (giant binoculars) and general observation (portable binoculars). Binoculars specifically geared towards astronomical viewing will have larger aperture objectives (in the 70 mm or 80 mm range) because the diameter of the objective lens increases the total amount of light captured, and therefore determines the faintest star that can be observed. Binoculars designed specifically for astronomical viewing (often 80 mm and larger) are sometimes designed without prisms in order to allow maximum light transmission. Such binoculars also usually have changeable eyepieces to vary magnification. Binoculars with high magnification and heavy weight usually require some sort of mount to stabilize the image. A magnification of 10x is generally considered the practical limit for observation with handheld binoculars. Binoculars more powerful than 15×70 require support of some type for stable and comfortable viewing. Much larger binoculars have been made by amateur telescope makers, essentially using two refracting or reflecting astronomical telescopes.

Of particular relevance for low-light and astronomical viewing is the ratio between magnifying power and objective lens diameter. A lower magnification facilitates a larger field of view which is useful in viewing the Milky Way and large nebulous objects (referred to as deep sky objects) such as the nebulae and galaxies. The large (typical 7.14 mm using 7×50) exit pupil [objective (mm)/power] of these devices results in a small portion of the gathered light not being usable by individuals whose pupils do not sufficiently dilate. For example, the pupils of those over 50 rarely dilate over 5 mm wide. The large exit pupil also collects more light from the background sky, effectively decreasing contrast, making the detection of faint objects more difficult except perhaps in remote locations with negligible light pollution. Many astronomical objects of 8 magnitude or brighter, such as the star clusters, nebulae and galaxies listed in the Messier Catalog, are readily viewed in hand-held binoculars in the 35 to 40 mm range, as are found in many households for birding, hunting, and viewing sports events. For observing smaller star clusters, nebulae, and galaxies binocular magnification is an important factor for visibility because these objects appear tiny at typical binocular magnifications.

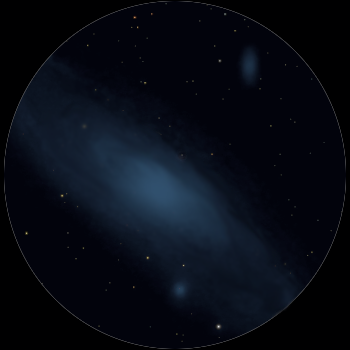
A simulated view of how the Andromeda Galaxy (Messier 31) would appear in a pair of binoculars

Some open clusters, such as the bright double cluster (NGC 869 and NGC 884) in the constellation Perseus, and globular clusters, such as M13 in Hercules, are easy to spot. Among nebulae, M17 in Sagittarius and the North America Nebula (NGC 7000) in Cygnus are also readily viewed. Binoculars can show a few of the wider-split binary stars such as Albireo in the constellation Cygnus.

A number of Solar System objects that are mostly to completely invisible to the human eye are reasonably detectable with medium-size binoculars, including larger craters on the Moon; the dim outer planets Uranus and Neptune; the inner "minor planets" Ceres, Vesta and Pallas; Saturn's largest moon Titan; and the Galilean moons of Jupiter. Although visible unaided in pollution-free skies, Uranus and Vesta require binoculars for easy detection. 10×50 binoculars are limited to an apparent magnitude of +9.5 to +11 depending on sky conditions and observer experience. Asteroids like Interamnia, Davida, Europa and, unless under exceptional conditions, Hygiea, are too faint to be seen with commonly sold binoculars. Likewise too faint to be seen with most binoculars are the planetary moons, except the Galileans and Titan, and the dwarf planets Pluto and Eris. Other difficult binocular targets include the phases of Venus and the rings of Saturn. Only binoculars with very high magnification, 20x or higher, are capable of discerning Saturn's rings to a recognizable extent. High-power binoculars can sometimes show one or two cloud belts on the disk of Jupiter, if optics and observing conditions are sufficiently good.

Binoculars can also aid in observation of human-made space objects, such as spotting satellites in the sky as they pass.

== List of binocular manufacturers ==
There are many companies that manufacturer binoculars, both past and present. They include:

- Barr and Stroud (UK) – sold binoculars commercially and primary supplier to the Royal Navy in WWII. The new range of Barr & Stroud binoculars are currently made in China (Nov. 2011) and distributed by Optical Vision Ltd.
- Bausch & Lomb (US) – has not made binoculars since 1976, when they licensed their name to Bushnell, Inc., who made binoculars under the Bausch & Lomb name until the license expired, and was not renewed, in 2005.
- BELOMO (Belarus) – both porro prism and roof prism models manufactured.
- Bresser (Germany)
- Bushnell Corporation (US)
- Blaser (Germany)– Premium binoculars
- Canon Inc (Japan) – I.S. series: porro variants
- Celestron (US).
- Docter Optics (Germany) – Nobilem series: porro prisms
- Fujinon (Japan) – FMTSX, FMTSX-2, MTSX series: porro
- I.O.R. (Romania)
- Kazan Optical-Mechanical Plant (KOMZ) (Russia) – manufactures a variety of porro prism models, sold under the trade name Baigish
- Kowa (Japan)
- Krasnogorsky Zavod (Russia) – both porro prism and roof prism models, models with optical stabilizers. The factory is part of the Shvabe Holding Group
- Leica Camera (Germany) – Noctivid, Ultravid, Duovid, Geovid, Trinovid: most are roof prism, with a few high end porro prism examples
- Leupold & Stevens, Inc (US)
- Meade Instruments (US) – Glacier (roof prism), TravelView (porro), CaptureView (folding roof prism) and Astro Series (roof prism). Also sells under the name Coronado.
- Meopta (Czech Republic) – Meostar B1 (roof prism)
- Minox (Germany)
- Nikon (Japan) – EDG, High Grade, Monarch, RAII, and Spotter series: roof prism; Prostar, Superior E, E, and Action EX series: porro; Prostaff series, Aculon series
- Olympus Corporation (Japan)
- Pentax (Japan) – DCFED/SP/XP series: roof prism; UCF series: inverted porro; PCFV/WP/XCF/SP series: porro
- Sill Optics (Optolyth brand) (Germany) – both porro prism and roof prism models
- Steiner-Optik (in German) (Germany)
- PRAKTICA (UK) for birdwatching, sightseeing, hiking, camping
- Swarovski Optik (Austria)
- Takahashi Seisakusho (Japan)
- Tasco (US)
- Vixen (telescopes) (Japan) – Apex/Apex Pro: roof prism; Ultima: porro
- Vivitar (US)
- Vortex Optics (US)
- Zeiss (Germany) – FL, Victory, Conquest: roof prism; 7×50 BGAT/T: porro, 15×60 BGA/T: porro, discontinued

== See also ==
- Anti-fog
- Binoviewer
- Globe effect
- Lens
- List of telescope types
- Monocular
- Optical telescope
- Retroreflector
- Large Binocular Telescope
- Spotting scope
- Tower viewer
