= Monocular =

Optical device

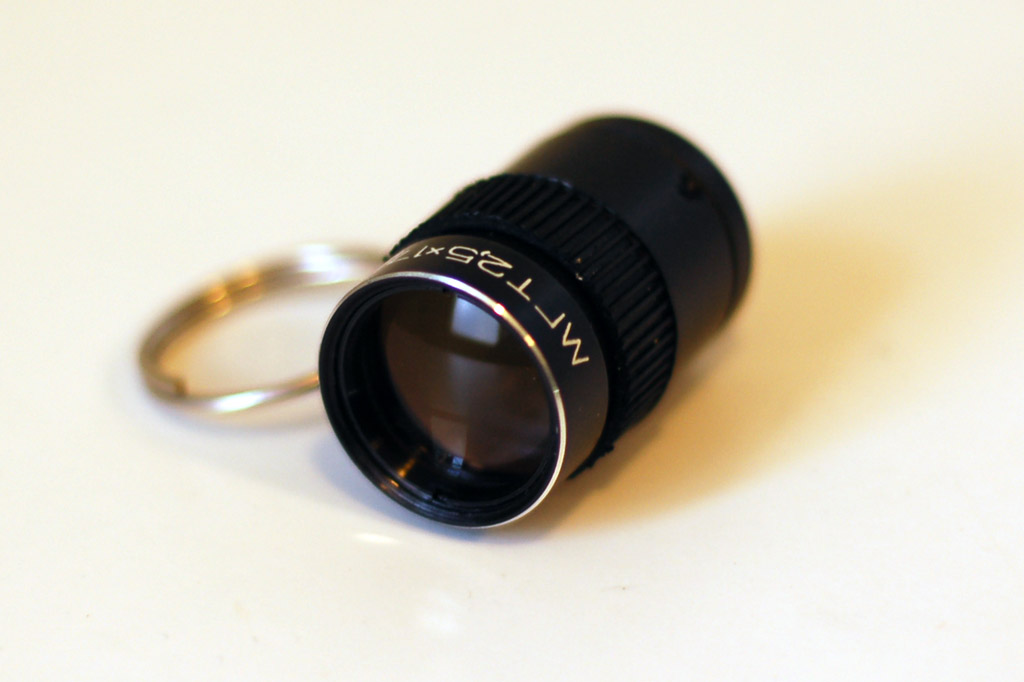
Galilean type Soviet-made miniature 2.5 × 17.5 monocular

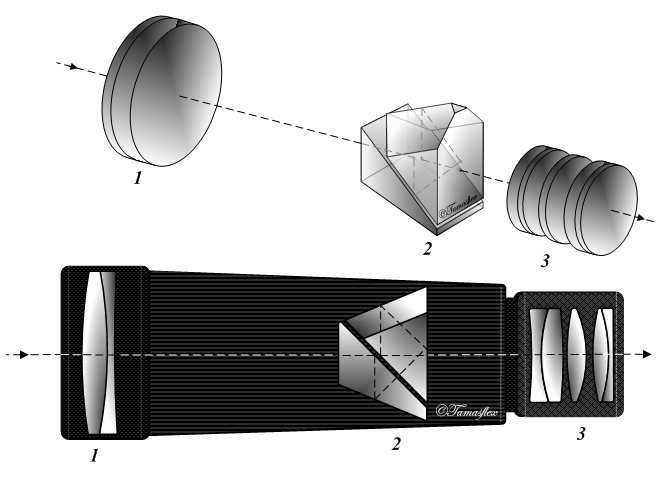
Diagram of a monocular using a Schmidt-Pechan prism: 1 – Objective lens 2 – Schmidt-Pechan prism 3 – Eyepiece

A monocular is a compact refracting telescope used to magnify images of distant objects, typically using an optical prism to ensure an erect image, instead of using relay lenses like most telescopic sights. The volume and weight of a monocular are typically less than half of a pair of binoculars with similar optical properties, making it more portable and also less expensive. This is because binoculars are essentially a pair of monoculars packed together — one for each eye. As a result, monoculars only produce two-dimensional images, while binoculars can use two parallaxed images (each for one eye) to produce binocular vision, which allows stereopsis and depth perception.

Monoculars are ideally suited to those applications where three-dimensional perception is not needed, or where compactness and low weight are important (e.g. hiking). Monoculars are also sometimes preferred where difficulties occur using both eyes through binoculars due to significant eyesight variation (e.g. strabismus, anisometropia or astigmatism) or unilateral visual impairment (due to amblyopia, cataract or corneal ulceration).

Conventional refracting telescopes that use relay lenses have a straight optical path that is relatively long; as a result, monoculars normally use Porro or roof prisms to "fold up" the optical path, which makes it much shorter and compact (see the entry on binoculars for details). However, monoculars also tend to have lower magnification factors than telescopes of the same objective size, and typically lack the capacity of variable magnification.

Visually impaired people may use monoculars to see objects at distances at which people with normal vision do not have difficulty, e.g., to read text on a chalkboard or projection screen. Applications for viewing more distant objects include natural history, hunting, marine and military. Compact monoculars are also used in art galleries and museums to obtain a closer view of exhibits.

When high magnification, a bright image, and good resolution of distant images are required, a relatively larger instrument is preferred (i.e. a telescope), often mounted on a tripod. A smaller pocket-sized "pocket scope" (i.e. a typical monocular) can be used for less stringent applications. These comments are quantified below.

Whereas there is a huge range of binoculars on the world market, monoculars are less widely available and with a limited choice in the top quality bracket, with some traditionally very high quality optical manufacturers not offering monoculars at all. Today, most monoculars are manufactured in Japan, China, Russia and Germany, with China offering more product variety than most. Prices range widely, from the highest specification designs listed at over £300 down to "budget" offerings at under £10. (As at February 2016).

== Monocular sizes ==
As with binoculars and telescopes, monoculars are primarily defined by two parameters: magnification and objective lens diameter, for example, 8×30 where 8 is the magnification and 30 is the objective lens diameter in mm (this is the lens furthest from the eye). An 8× magnification makes the distant object appear to be 8 times larger at the eye. Contemporary monoculars are typically compact and most normally within a range of 4× magnification to 10×, although specialized units outside these limits are available. Variable magnification or zoom is sometimes provided, but has drawbacks and is not normally found on the top quality monoculars. The objective lens diameter is typically in the range 20mm to 42mm. Care is needed in interpreting some monocular specifications where numerical values are applied loosely and inaccurately—e.g. "39×95", which on a small cheap monocular is more likely to refer to the physical dimensions than the optical parameters. (This is covered in more detail in the section "Interpreting product specifications" below.)

As with binoculars, possibly the most common and popular magnification for most purposes is 8×. This represents a usable magnification in many circumstances and is reasonably easy to hold steady without a tripod or monopod. At this magnification, the field of view is relatively wide, making it easier to locate and follow distant objects. For viewing at longer distances, 10× or 12× is preferable if the user is able to hold the monocular steady. However, increasing magnification will compromise the field of view and the relative brightness of the object. These and other considerations are major factors influencing the choice of magnification and objective lens diameter. Although very high numerical magnification sounds impressive on paper, in reality, for a pocket monocular it is rarely a good choice because of the very narrow field of view, poor image brightness, and great difficulty in keeping the image still when hand holding. Most serious users will eventually come to realize why 8× or 10× are so popular, as they represent possibly the best compromise and are the magnifications most commonly adopted in the very highest quality field monoculars (and binoculars).

Where a monocular ends and a telescope starts is debatable but a telescope is normally used for high magnifications (>20×) and with correspondingly larger objective lens diameter (e.g. 60–90mm). A telescope will be significantly heavier, more bulky, and much more expensive, than a monocular and, due to the high magnifications, will normally need a tripod, reflecting telescopes used for astronomy, typically, have inverted images. Most popular monocular sizes mimic popular binoculars – e.g. 7×25, 8×20, 8×30, 8×42, 10×42.

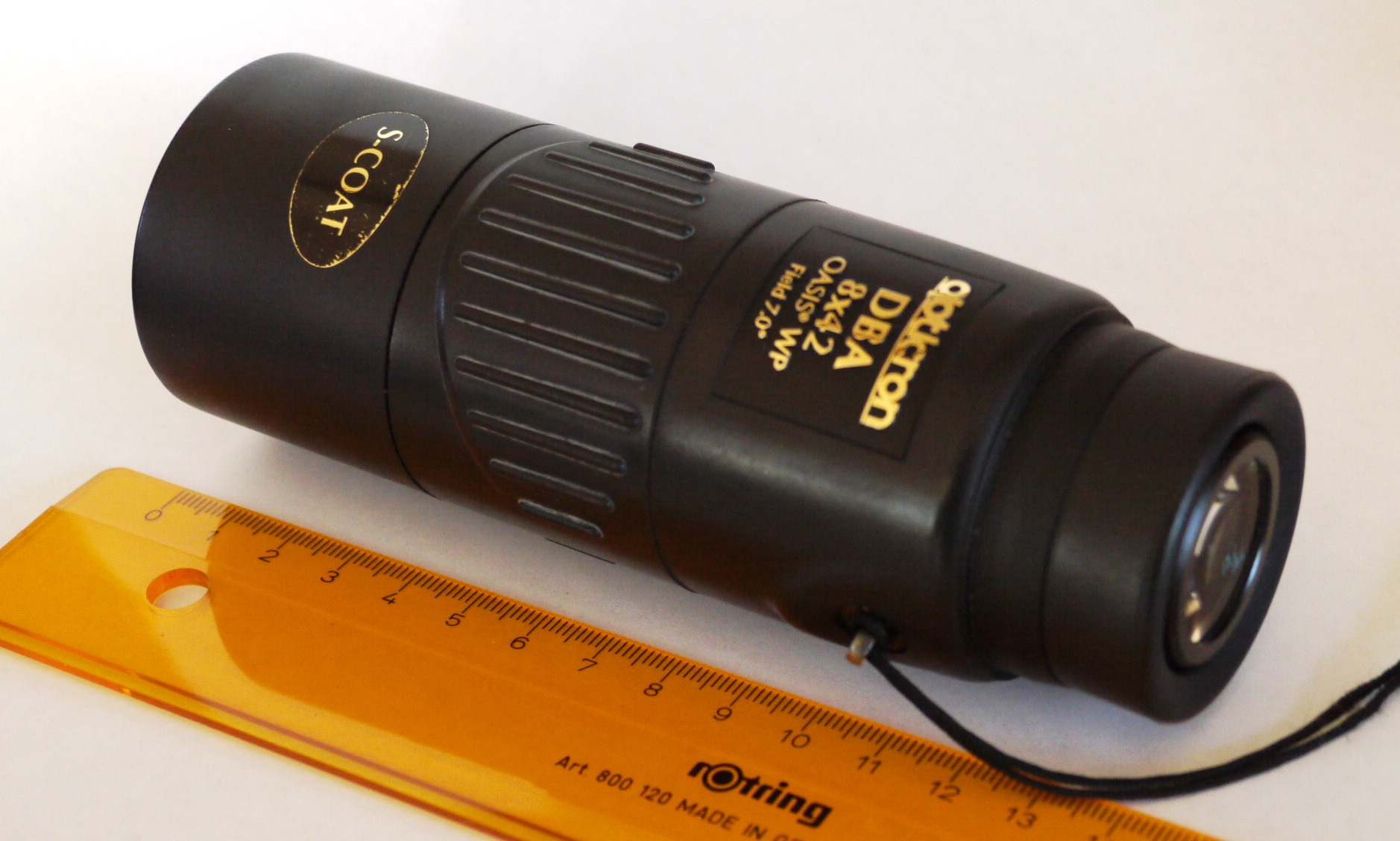
The highest specification 8× monocular from Opticron – 8×42 DBA

== Design ==
Much of the basic design considerations and related parameters are the same as for binoculars, and are covered in that entry, but some expanded comments have been added where appropriate:

- Prism type – porro or roof
- Lens & prism coating (the quality of coating can significantly affect light transmission and image brightness, and in the highest specifications is proportionally more expensive)
- Exit pupil

Exit pupil is defined as the diameter of the objective lens divided by the magnification and expressed in mm. (e.g. an 8×40 will give an exit pupil diameter of 5mm). For a given situation, the greater the exit pupil, the better the light transmission into the eye. Hence, a large objective lens with a low magnification will give good light admission, which is especially important in deteriorating light conditions. The classic 7×50 marine binocular or monocular is ideally suited to low light conditions with its relatively large exit pupil diameter of 7.1mm and a realistic magnification which is practical on a moving boat. However, the exit pupil should be considered in relationship with the human eye pupil diameter. If the exit pupil of the chosen instrument is greater than the human eye pupil, then there will be no benefit, as the eye will be the limiting factor in light admission. In effect, the extra light-gathering potential is wasted. This is a consideration as one ages because human eye pupil dilation range diminishes with age, as shown as an approximate guide in the table below.

Average eye pupil diameter change versus age
Age (yrs.)	Day Pupil (mm)	Night Pupil (mm)
20	4.7	8
30	4.3	7
40	3.9	6
50	3.5	5
60	3.1	4.1
70	2.7	3.2
80	2.3	2.5

- Twilight factor (related to magnification and objective lens diameter and is a guide to the ability to see detail at low light conditions and does not necessarily indicate brightness)
- Transmittance (the % of light transmitted through the monocular, indicating brightness and will be over 90% in quality instruments)
- Field of view (important in being able to see a wide panorama and not appearing to be looking down a tunnel).

Field of view (FOV) and magnification are related; FOV increases with decreasing magnification and vice versa. This applies to monoculars, binoculars, and telescopes. However, this relationship also depends on optical design and manufacture, which can cause some variation. The following chart shows the FOV/magnification relationship based on best-in-class data, taken both from tests and manufacturers' specifications. Contrary to some belief, it is a myth that binoculars offer a wider field of view than monoculars. For a given specification and manufacturer offering, both monocular or binocular options of the same model, the field of view is exactly the same, whether monocular or binocular.

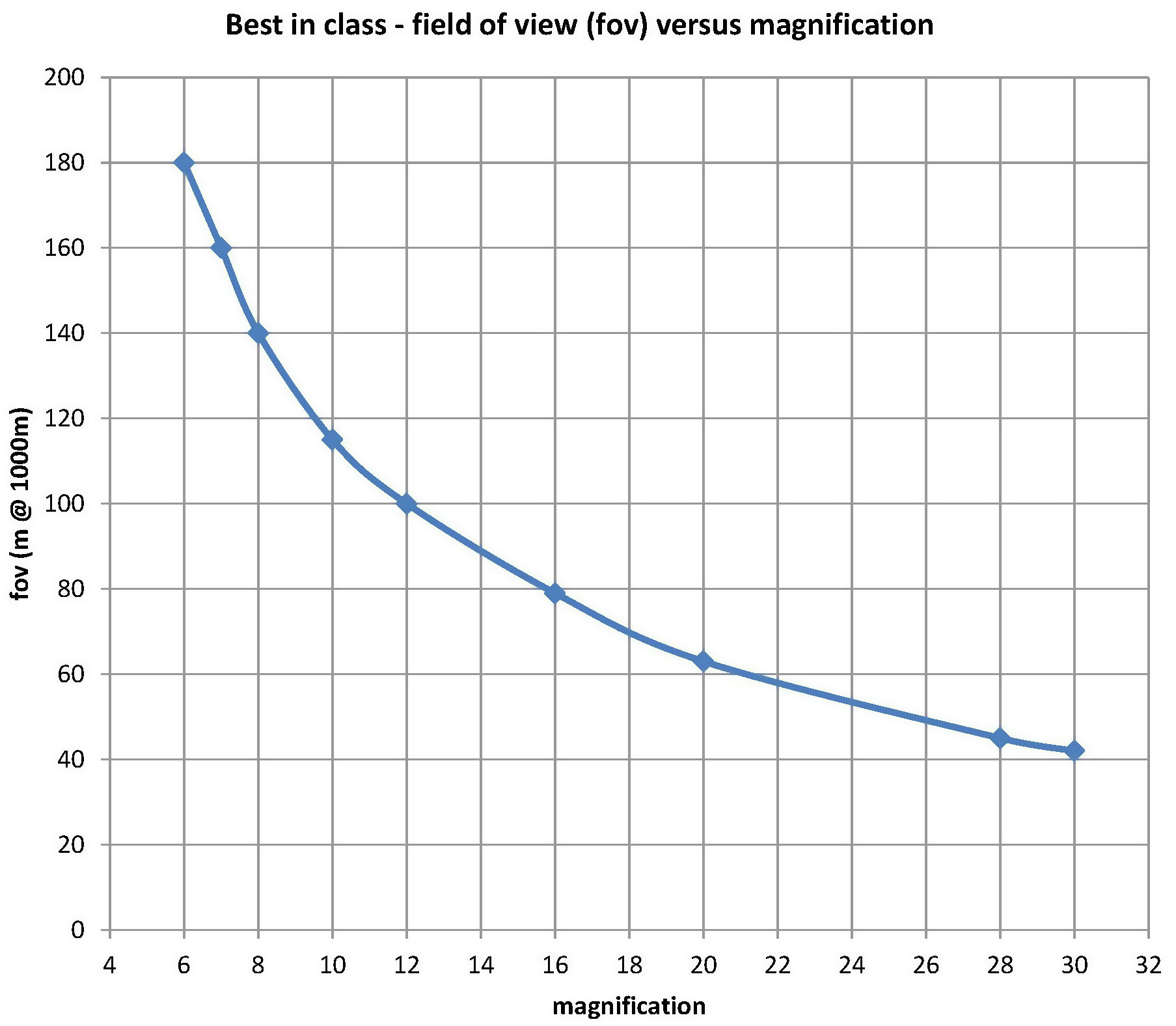
Chart of field of view (m @ 1000m) versus magnification based on best-in-class data

- Water/fog proofing
- General construction – material (metal, plastic), types of body coating
- Armoured body protection (to resist knocks and damage in the field)
- Lens protection/covers (some are integrated, some loose)
- Eye relief

Eye relief is a particularly important (but often overlooked) parameter for spectacle wearers, if the full field of view is to be visible. Although magnification, objective lens diameter, and field of viewn(either in degrees or m @1000m) are often shown on the body of the monocular, eye relief virtually never is (except, perhaps, to say "long eye relief" or "LER"). Early optics tended to have short eye relief, (sub-10mm) but more contemporary designs are much better. At least 15mm is desirable—ideally near 20mm—for spectacle wearers. (See table of eye reliefs below noting the best in class, Opticron 5×30 at 25mm and Opticron 8×42 DBA, at 21mm). Eye relief can seriously compromise the field of view if too short, so even if an optic has a good field of view specification, without an accompanying long eye relief, the benefit of the wide view will not be obtained (again, only applying to spectacle wearers). The eye lens diameter can greatly facilitate good eye relief. The photograph below shows a comparison between two 8× monoculars. The one on the left, typical of a 1980s-design, features a relatively small eyepiece lens diameter (11mm) and eye relief (<10mm). The one on the right is from 2016, featuring a comparatively larger eyepiece diameter (24mm) and eye relief (~15mm). This large eyepiece lens not only helps eye relief, but also helps to create a wider field of view.

Two 8× monoculars showing eye lens diameter comparison

Two additional aspects which are particularly relevant in the context of monoculars are the following:

- Focusing mechanism

A significant difference between binoculars and monoculars is in the focusing system. Today, binoculars almost universally use a central wheel focusing system, operating on both sides simultaneously. Some large observation binoculars, as well as some older designs, feature individual focusing on each eyepiece. Monoculars, however, employ a variety of different focusing systems, all with pros and cons. These include the following:

- A large knurled focusing ring around the body of the monocular
- A small focusing ring, close to the eyepiece
- A small external focusing wheel, alongside and/or above the monocular
  Asika 8×42 and Visionary 12×50 showing top-wheel focusing
- A small focusing lever
  Opticron Trailfinder 8×25 showing focusing lever
- A sliding focus button
  Eschenbach 6×16 showing sliding focus button
- A toggle-focus mechanism on top of the monocular
- A large knurled ring surrounding the objective lens
- "Dual focus," where there are two focusing rings.

The most common type is the focusing ring around the body. This retains the compactness of the unit, but requires two hands to operate and does not give particularly fast focusing. In some units, the ring can be stiff to operate.

The small ring near the eyepiece also usually needs two hands to operate, and, in some designs, can interfere with the twist-up eye cup. Being small, it can, also be less convenient to operate, especially whilst wearing gloves. The degree of twist, from closest focus to infinity, varies between manufacturers. Some use a very small twist (about a quarter of a turn), whereas others use a full turn or more. The small degree of twist gives a very fast focus, but can be overly sensitive, and, in some designs, be too stiff to use with one hand. A full turn is a practical compromise.

A focusing wheel tends not to be used on top quality monoculars (with the exception of the Bushnell 10×42HD Legend), but is particularly popular on budget offerings from China. Although it makes the monocular more bulky, it does give very convenient focusing with one hand (via one finger) and is particularly fast and smooth, which is necessary in circumstances where quick, accurate changes of focus are important (e.g. bird watching, in a wood).

A focusing lever is not common, but is used, for example, on the Opticron Trailfinder. This mechanism provides very quick focusing while retaining compactness, but can be stiff and overly sensitive to use, and again, ideally needs two hands.

Minox and some others use a slider button, rather than a lever, on low magnification, ultra-compact designs. This slider button is pushed side to side, which is also fast, but sensitive.

Toggle focus is very rarely used (e.g. Carson Bandit 8×25). It provides a one-handed focus mechanism in a relatively large toggle, making it quick and easy to operate "in the field" with gloves, but can be over-sensitive and difficult to fine tune.

The knurled ring around the objective lens appears to be a unique feature of the Minox 8×25 Macroscope and claims to provide quick focusing.

Some low-budget entry-level monoculars from China claim "dual focusing", which means focusing by means of twisting either the main body of the monocular and/or the smaller ring near the eyepiece (referred to as the dioptre adjustment on binoculars). Why dual focusing is felt necessary on a monocular is questionable, but could be for marketing reasons; there is no real technical benefit to such a system, which is never found on the top-quality monoculars from manufacturers like Opticron, Leica, and Zeiss.

- Zoom or variable magnification

Like binoculars, zoom magnification is sometimes available, but it is not found in the best quality units (both binoculars and monoculars) as the optical quality and field of view are compromised. Although zoom systems are widely and successfully used on cameras for observation optics, zoom systems with any credibility are reserved for top quality spotting scopes and are expensive. Zoom monoculars are available from some "budget" manufacturers, which sound impressive on paper, but often have extreme and unrealistic magnification ranges, as well as an extremely narrow field of view.

== Some examples of current monoculars by specification ==
Some examples of current monoculars
	price band	eye relief mm	FoV m @1000m	FoV angle	FoV apparent angle	exit pupil mm	weight g	body length mm	body dia mm	Comments
Leica Monovid 8×20	A	15.0	110	6.3	50	2.5	112	98	36	Comes with close-up lens
Opticron 8×42 DBA	A	21.0	122	7.0	56	5.3	343	143	52	Very long eye relief
Opticron 10×42 DBA	A	19.0	105	6.0	60	4.2	349	143	52	
Zeiss Mono 8×20	B	15.0	110	6.3	50	2.5	67	101	?	
Bushnell 10×42HD Legend	B	15.2	113	6.5	65	4.2	374	137	?	Quick focus wheel
Opticron 10×42 BGA	C	16.0	89	5.1	51	4.2	285	136	43	
Opticron 8×32 LE	C	16.0	131	7.5	60	4.0	272	139	49	
Opticron 4×12G	C	14.0	219	12.5	50	3.0	49	58	32	"Gallery scope"
Opticron 5×30	C	25.0	122	7.0	35	6.0	252	139	49	Very long eye relief
Opticron Trailfinder 8×25	D	14.0	119	6.8	54	3.1	131	100	35	Quick focus lever
Asika 8×42	E	17.5	121	6.9	55	5.3	329	135	50	Quick focus wheel
Notes FoV = field of view (expressed either as m@1000m or as an angle in degrees) Exit pupil = Objective lens dia in mm divided by magnification Price bands: A – £250–350; B – £150–249; C – £75–149; D – £40–74; E – < £40

(Prices are typical UK selling prices as of February 2016.)

== Interpreting product specifications ==
As mentioned previously, product specifications can sometimes be misleading, confusing or incorrect values stated. Such inaccuracies are more commonly found on budget items but have also sometimes been seen from some brand leaders. For those not experienced in interpreting such specifications, it is always wise to try out the item before buying wherever possible. Some of the descriptors needing particular care with include:

- Basic size (e.g. 8×30). As mentioned earlier, examples are sometimes seen where product physical dimensions or some other arbitrary figures are stated instead of magnification and objective lens diameter. This is very misleading and does not properly describe the product. Examples seen include a "40×60" in a compact monocular, where the objective lens diameter was actually 40mm (and the magnification was certainly not 40×). Another, described as "35×95", was actually a 20×40. Also, in a few cases, the overall diameter of the case surrounding the objective lens is used, rather than the lens itself, thus making it seem the objective lens is bigger than it truly is. Magnifications can also be exaggerated, an example of a claimed 16× in reality being closer to an 8x, with the number "16" probably referring to the eyepiece lens diameter. In this case, the claimed "16×52" was in reality an "8×42". Care is needed with such misleading and exaggerated specifications, more likely to be found on some very low budget items.
- "Day–night vision" or sometimes just "night vision" is another misleading descriptor commonly seen in the specification of low-end, budget monoculars as it gives the impression the item is a night-vision instrument, effective in darkness, when it clearly is not. True night vision monoculars (or "image intensifiers", as typically used in military applications for example) use an electrical power source for light enhancement and are substantially more expensive and bulky than a comparable normal monocular.
- Zoom is sometimes stated where there is no zoom facility. Zoom means a variable magnification facility, as often seen on cameras, for example. The term "zoom" or misleading phrases like "power zoom" or "mega zoom" are used incorrectly when referring to a single magnification optic. Zoom values will always be two numbers separated by a hyphen (e.g. 8–20) and then followed by the objective lens diameter (e.g. 8–20×50). As mentioned elsewhere in this entry, a true zoom facility can be seen on some budget monoculars but with very significant optical limitations.
- Field of view (fov) specification. This parameter is sometimes stated incorrectly (over-stated) and needs interpreting with care when buying an instrument without first field-testing. It is normally expressed in degrees, m@1000m or ft@1000yds. An approximate conversion from degrees to m@1000m is to multiply degrees by 17.5 which can be used as a check if both values are stated. The author has carried out fov tests on several monoculars and the results shown in the table below. Generally, the manufacturer's stated figure is accurate within a few percentages but two were considerably over-stated, one in particular (9×30) by 30%. When reviewing a claimed fov value, reference can be made to the fov/magnification relationship in Design, above. This relationship represents best-in-class and so anything substantially exceeding a fov value from this plot, for a given magnification, should be treated with caution, especially in budget offerings.

Field of view test results from 7 monoculars
	claimed (C)	actual (A)	C/A (%)
6×30	180	160	113
8×25	119	114	104
8×32	131	128	102
8×42	122	122	100
9×30	140	108	130
10×42	89	90	99
12×50	82	85	96

== Specialist monoculars ==
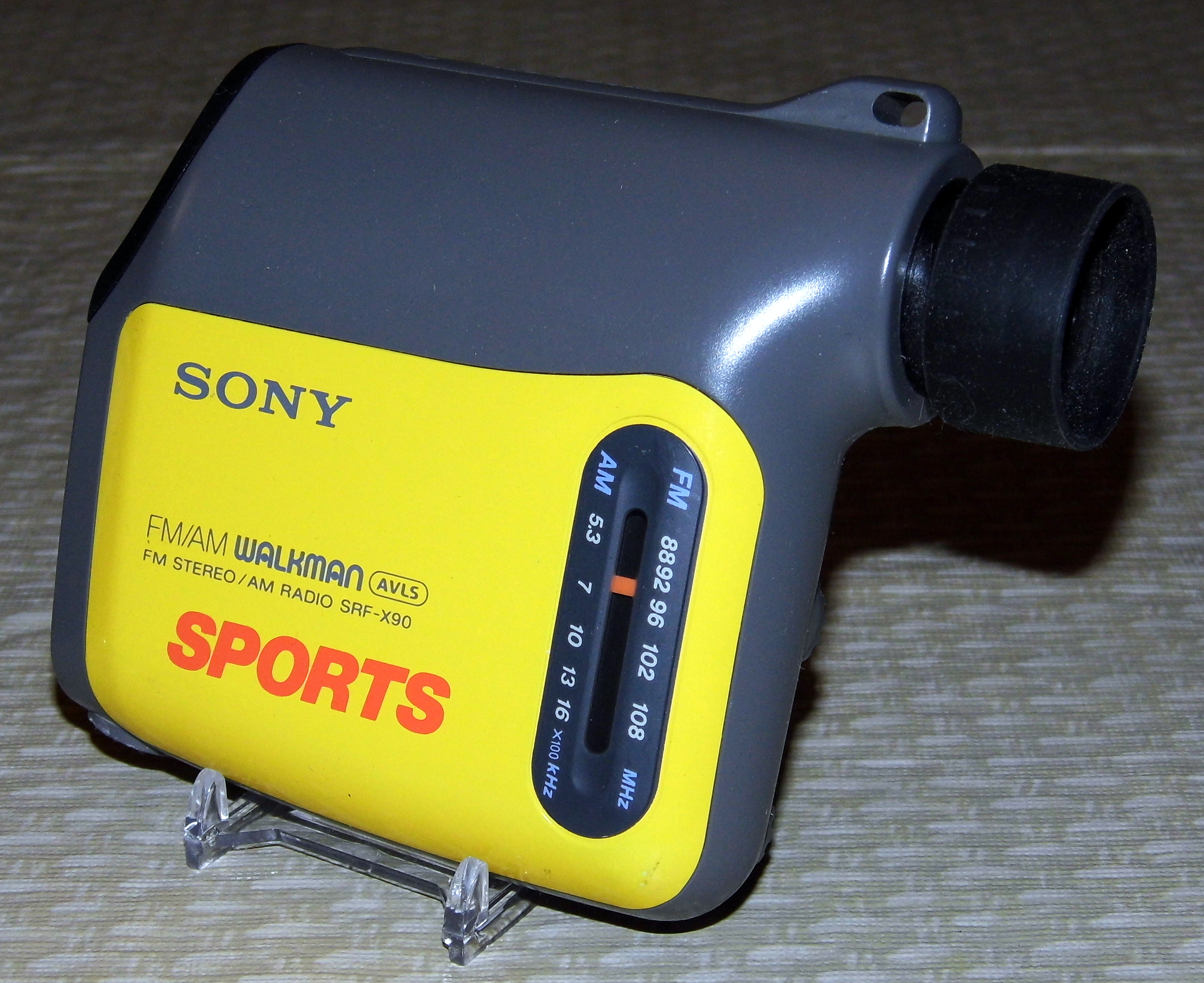
Sony Walkman with built-in 8× monocular

Some monoculars satisfy specialist requirements and include:

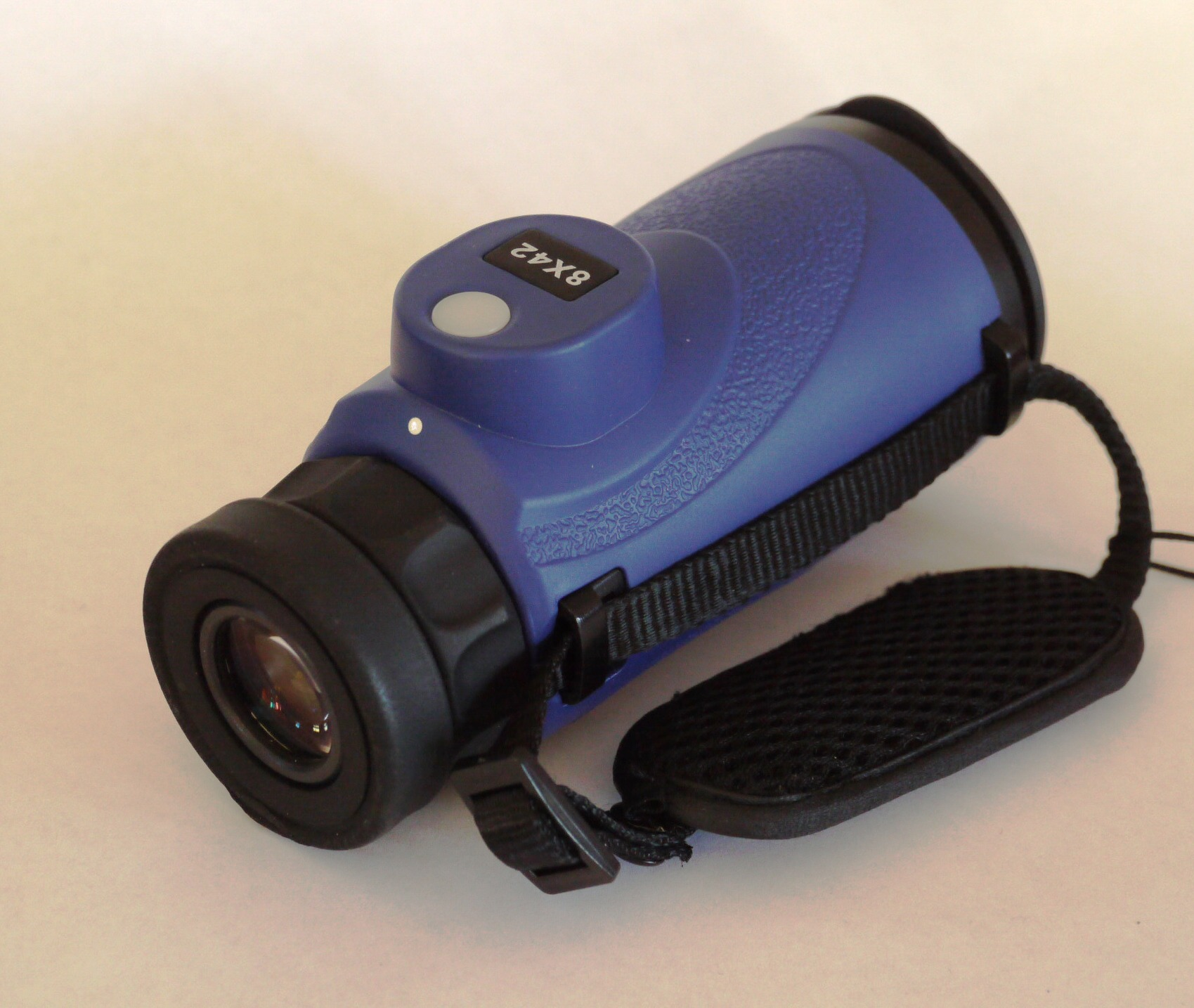
Seago 8×42 compass monocular

- Built-in compass
- Compact, folding monocular
- Night vision system (requiring a power source and usually having low magnification)
- Rangefinder/graticule
- Gallery scope (low magnification, wide field of view for use in museums and galleries)
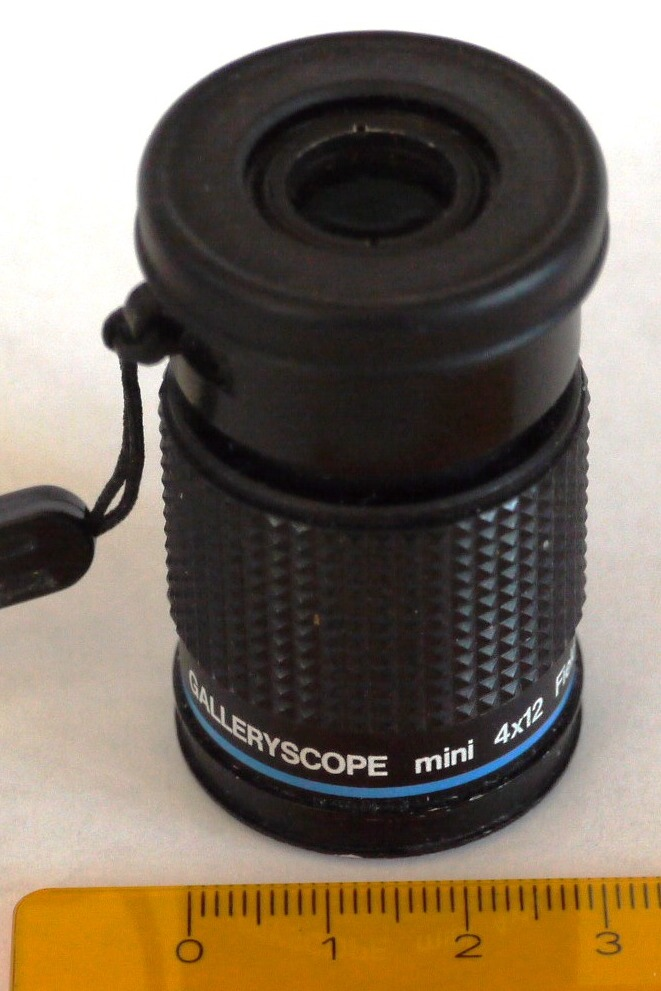
  KenMAX 4×12 gallery scope
- Microscope conversion & ultra-close focus
- Built-in image stabiliser

== See also ==
- History of the telescope
- List of telescope types
- Monocle
- Schmidt–Pechan prism
- Spotting scope
- Telescope
- Bearing compass
