= Leitz =

Leitz may refer to:

== Companies ==
- Esselte Leitz GmbH & Co KG, German manufacturer of office products
- Ernst Leitz GmbH, German firm, now divided into:
  - Leica Camera, manufacturer of cameras
  - Leica Geosystems, manufacturer of geodetic equipment
  - Leica Microsystems, manufacturer of microscopes and owner of the Leica brand
  - Leica Biosystems, cancer diagnostics company

== People ==
- Leitz (surname)
