= Spotting scope =

Compact high-power telescope

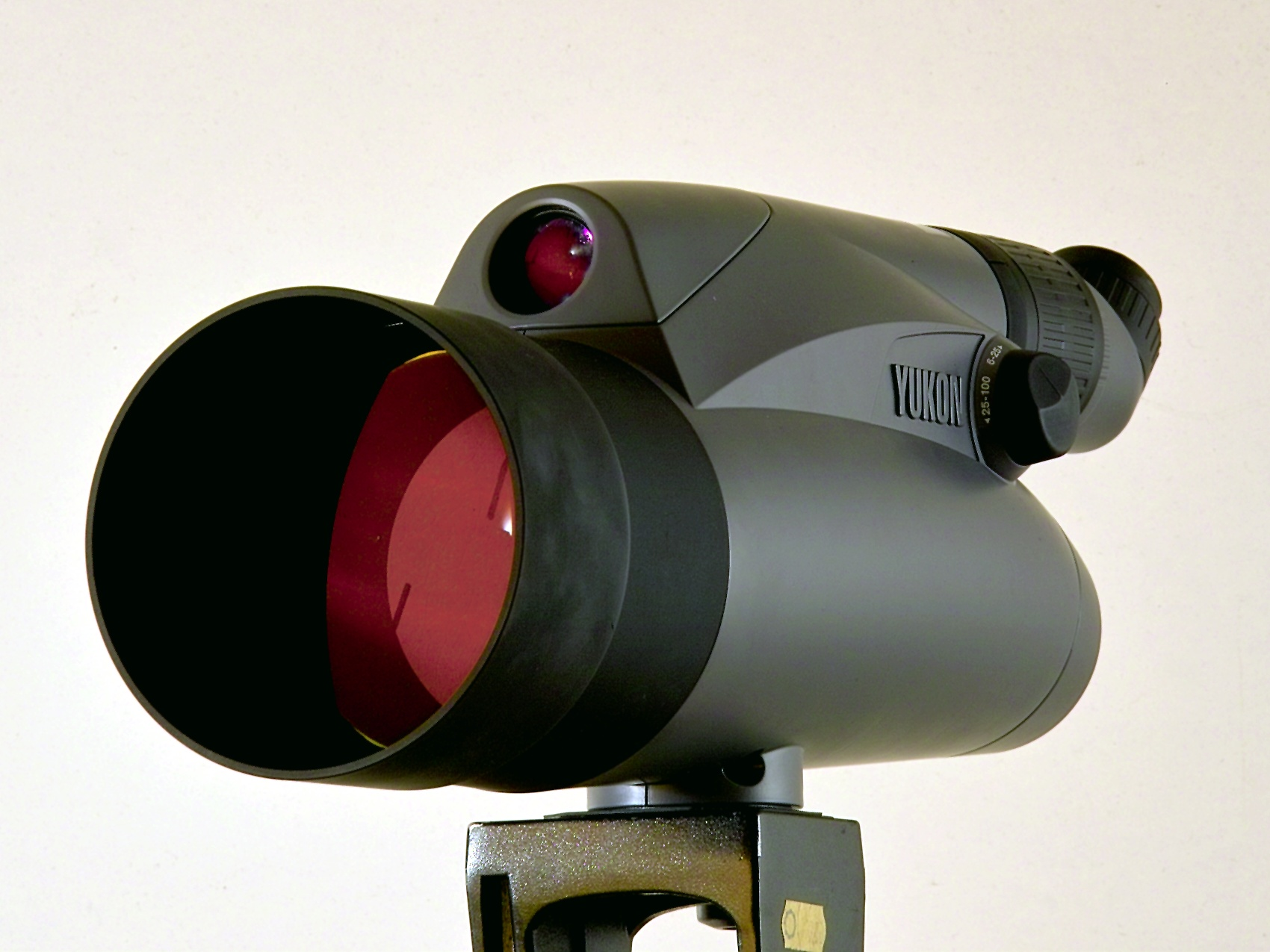
A 100mm spotting scope with a paraxial 30mm finderscope

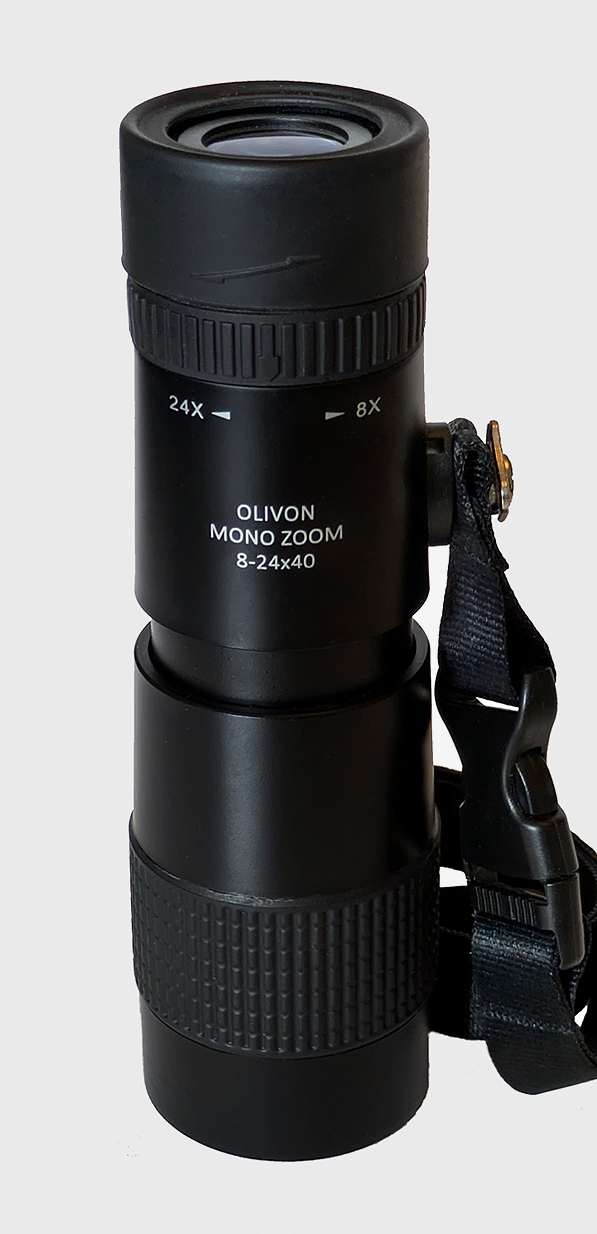
A compact spotting scope with 8-24x magnification, (corresponds to 400-1200 mm on a camera lens). The front lens is 40 mm in diameter and when fully extended, it has a length of 18 cm.

A spotting scope is a compact lightweight portable telescope optimized for detailed observation of distant objects. They are used as tripod mounted optical enhancement devices for various outdoor activities such as birdwatching, skygazing and other naturalist activities, for hunting and target shooting to verify a marksman's shot placements, for tactical ranging and surveillance, and for any other application that requires higher magnification than ordinary binoculars (typically 20× to 60×).

The light-gathering power and resolution of a spotting scope is determined by the diameter of the objective lens, typically between 50 and 80 mm (2.0 and 3.1 in). The larger the objective, the more massive and expensive the telescope.

The optical assembly has a small refracting objective lens, an internal image-erecting system, and an eyepiece that is usually removable. The image-erecting system may use relay lenses, prisms such as Porro or roof prisms, or a catadioptric system of the Schmidt or Maksutov design. Spotting scopes may have a ruggedized design, a mounting interface for attaching to a tripod, and an ergonomically designed and located control knob for focus adjustment. Some spotting scopes also have in-built reticles for stadiametric rangefinding.

Spotting scope eyepieces are usually interchangeable to adapt for different magnifications, or may have variable zoom to give a range of magnifications. Magnifications less than 20× are unusual, as are magnifications more than 60× since the latter can lead to poorer image brightness, a narrow field of view and too much image shaking, even on a tripod. The eyepiece mount layout can be "straight-through" (the eyepiece is on the same axis as the scope body), or "angled" (the eyepiece is at an angle to the scope body—usually 45 degrees).

The high magnification of spotting scopes makes them prone to image disturbance from vibrations, so they are often stabilized with tripods or (less commonly) monopods, which provide a stationary and steady platform. Tripod heads can be used to control any required movements of the scope.

== Gallery ==
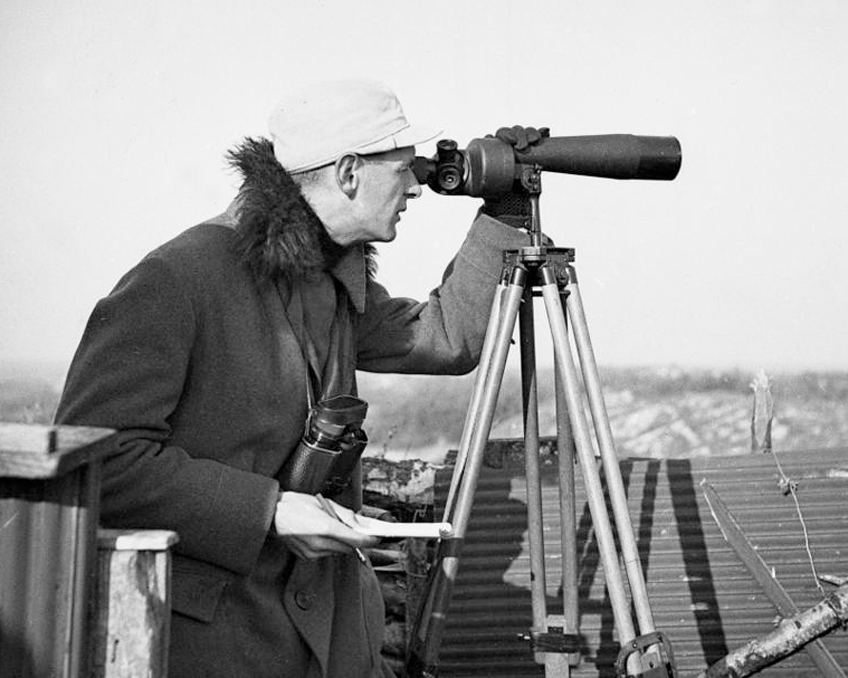
An ornithologist uses a spotting scope at Rossitten Bird Observatory in 1939. This spotting scope has no zoom eyepiece, but three interchangeable eyepieces with different magnifications

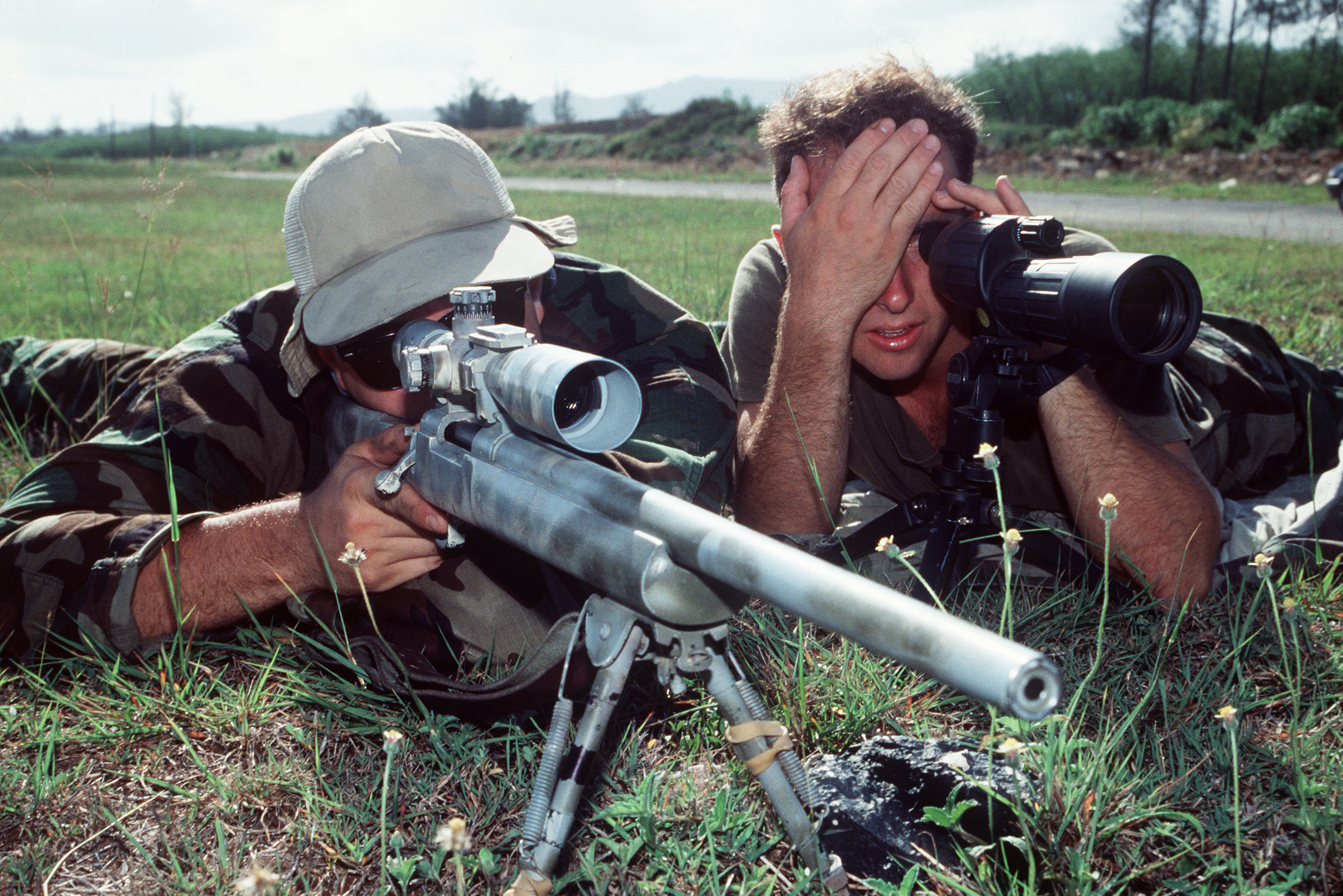
A spotter (right) uses a spotting scope to assist a marksman. Spotting scopes are used on target ranges to avoid walking to the target to verify the placement of hits

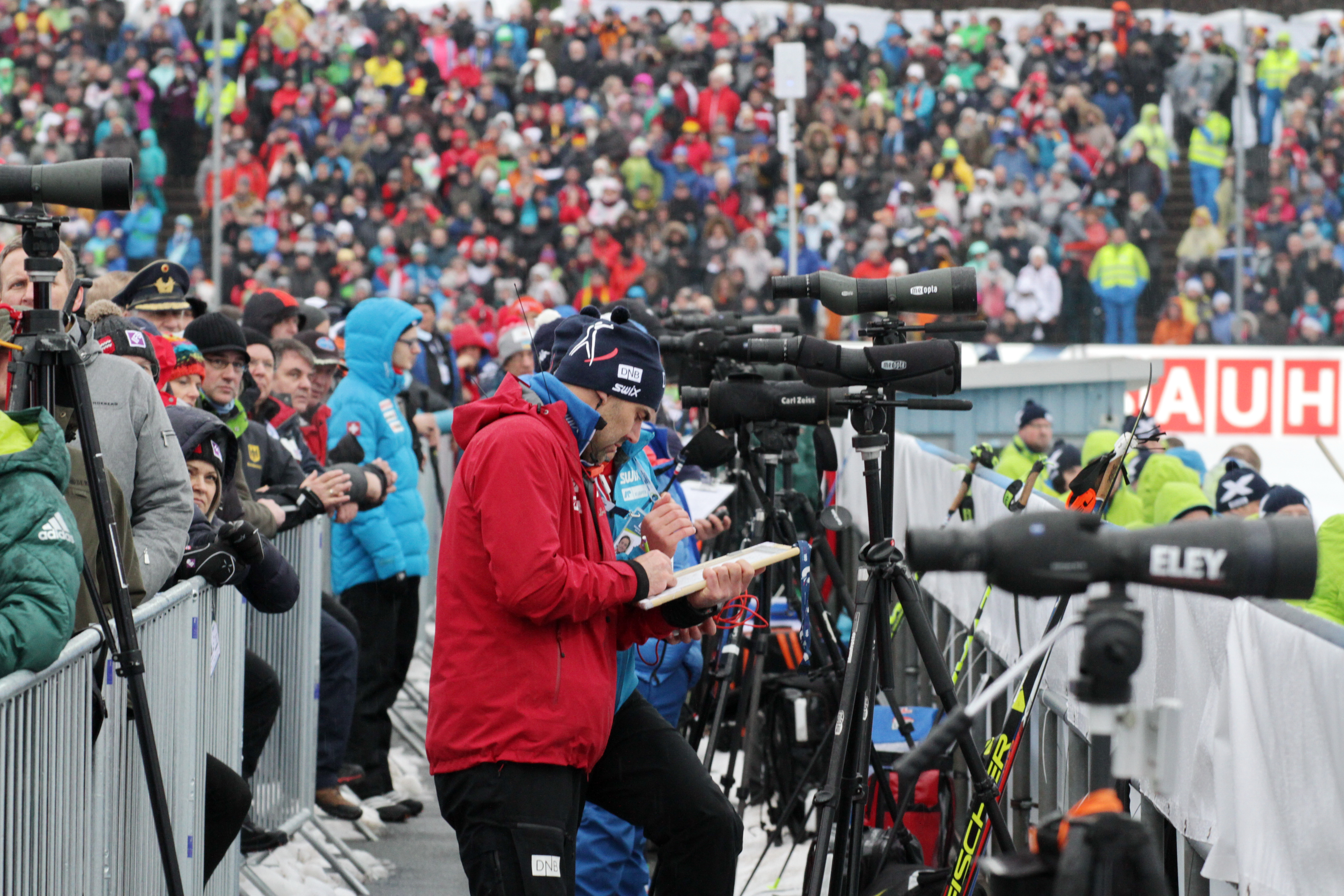
Biathlon coaches use spotting scopes to verify and optimize competitors shot placement

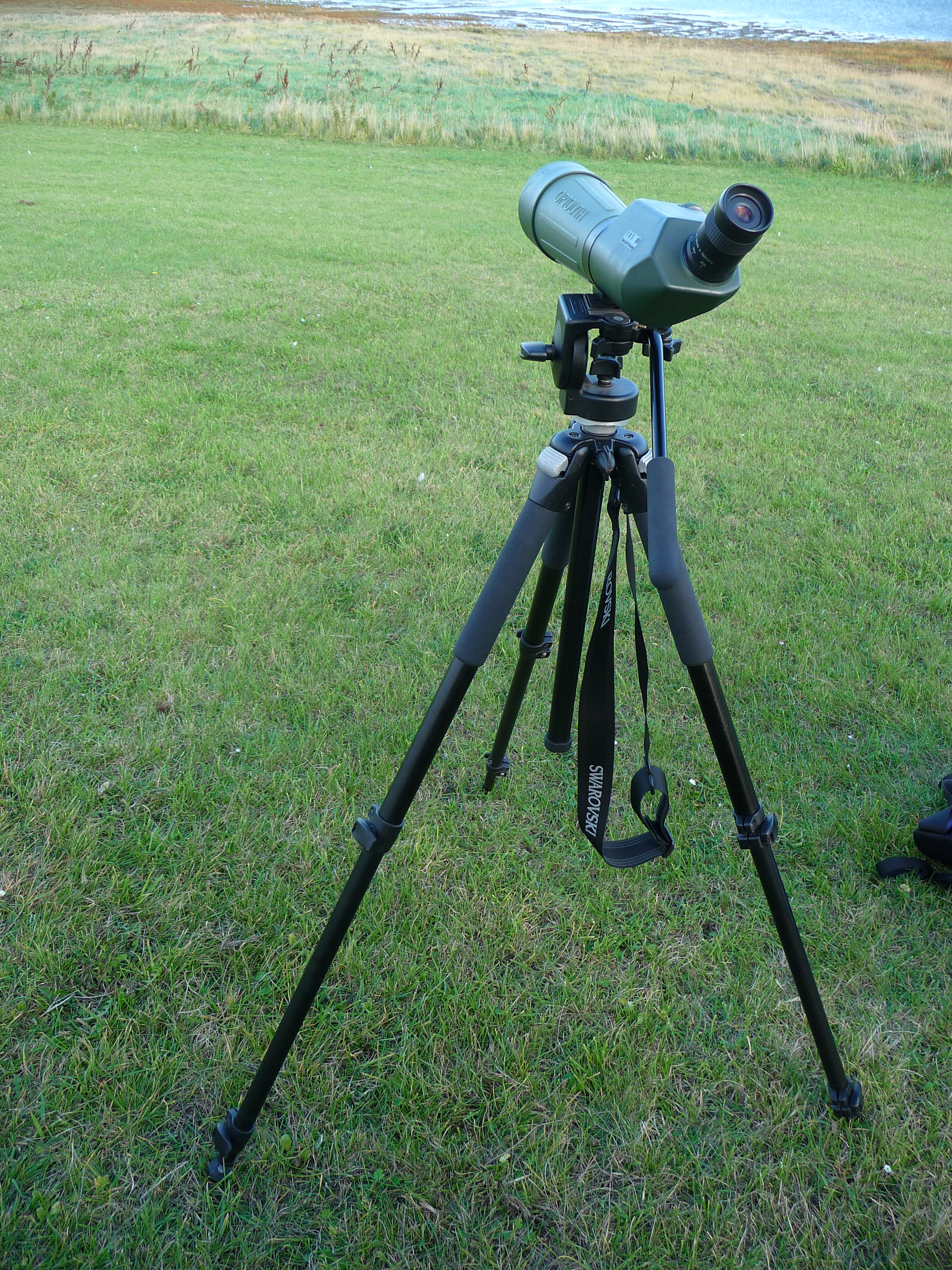
Spotting scope on its tripod

== See also ==
- Aircraft periscope
- Milliradian, an angular measurement used in reticled scopes intended for precision shooting
- Digiscoping, long-range videography using a spotting scope with a digital video recorder mounted to the eyepiece
- List of telescope types
- Monocular
