= Uppendahl prism =

Erecting prism

An Uppendahl prism is an erecting prism, i.e. a special reflection prism that is used to invert an image (rotation by 180°). The erecting system consists of three partial prisms made of optical glass with a high refractive index cemented together to form a symmetric assembly and is used in microscopy as well as in binoculars technology.

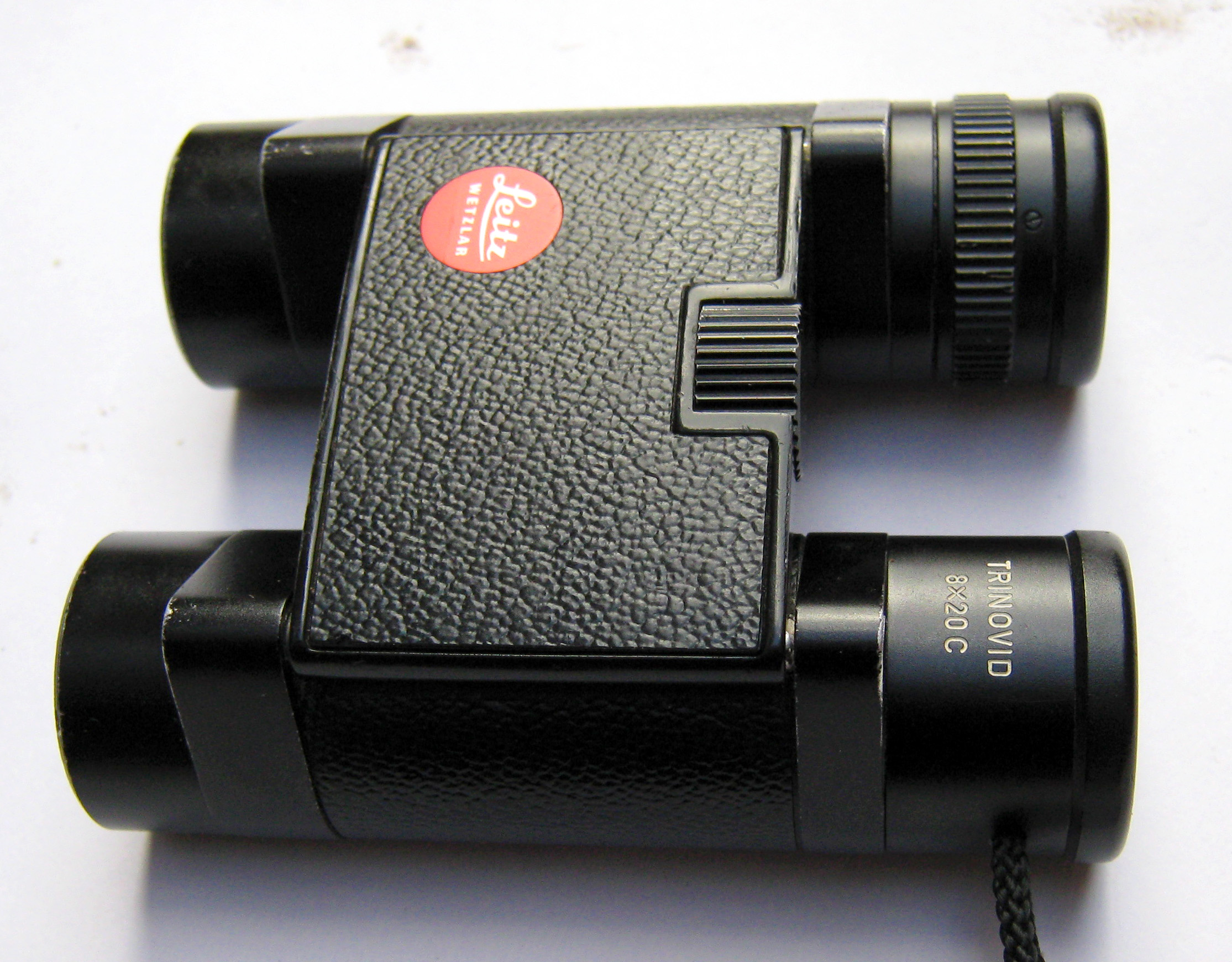
Leitz Wetzlar Trinovid 8×20 C binoculars expanded

In the past the Uppendahl prism system, for example in the Trinovid binoculars series from Leitz (since 1986 Leica), was commercially offered in some binoculars. The Trinovid series binoculars were introduced in 1958 and used at the time patented moving internal optical lenses between the ocular lens group and the prism assembly within the housing for focusing. Like the much more common optical lenses located between the objective lens group and the prism assembly method, this central internal focussing method does not change the volume of the binoculars. Bausch & Lomb Elite and Browning 7×35 binoculars, both made in Japan during the late 1980s to early 1990s, also used Uppendahl prisms.

In the early 2020s the commercial market share of Uppendahl prism type standard binoculars was nil. The Leica Geovid R (laser) rangefinder binoculars series and 7×24 Rangemaster monocular using a (modified) Uppendahl prism system were still commercially available.

== Method of operation ==
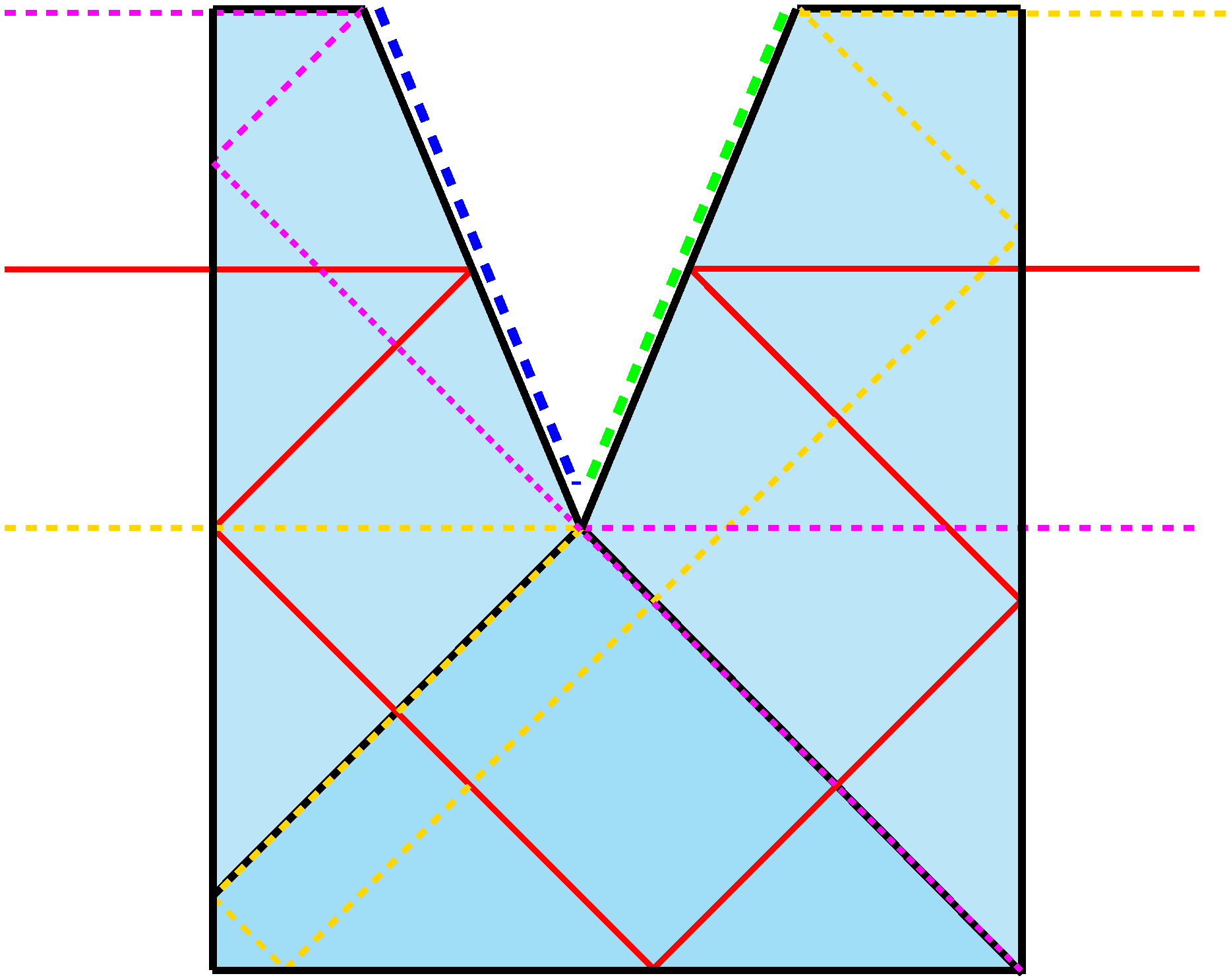
Beam path in the Uppendahl prism system (top view); Main ray (red) and marginal rays (magenta / yellow), mirroring (blue), roof edge (green)

The Uppendahl prism system is composed of three cemented prisms, with two glass/air transition surfaces. On its way through the first prism, the bundle of rays (red) is first reflected on a surface that is coated with either a metallic or a dielectric coating (mirroring) and a total internal reflection face just like the one used in a Schmidt–Pechan cluster only the light enters and leaves through the opposite ends as used in the Uppendahl. The other reflections of the beam take place by means of loss-free total internal reflection. The second prism is a 90° reflection and shouldn't need a mirroring coating. In order to achieve a complete reversal of the image, a roof edge is ground into the third prism (green). Furthermore, the beam leaves the inversion system without any axial offset, which is why the Uppendahl prism is counted among the straight-vision roof prisms. The net effect of the six reflections (two reflections are on roof plains). Since the light is reflected an even number of times, this produces a 180° image rotation (without changing the image's handedness) and allows use of the prism as an image erecting system to flip the image both vertically and horizontally.

An advantage of this prism system is that the light beam only passes two transitions between air and glass, which minimizes losses in the form of Fresnel reflections. The relatively strong folding of the beam path in the Uppendahl prism, which is only comparable with the compact Schmidt–Pechan prism system, supports the construction of compact optical instruments with short overall lengths.

== Problems with the Uppendahl prism ==
The Uppendahl roof prism system is from a purely technical point of view a rather complicated roof prism design. Light entering the Uppendahl design reflects more times and less efficient than in the Abbe-König prism design.

=== Reflection losses ===
Total internal reflection does not occur. To mitigate this problem, a mirror coating is used on a surface. Typically an aluminum mirror coating (reflectivity of 87% to 93%) or silver mirror coating (reflectivity of 95% to 98%) is used.

The transmission of the prism can be further improved by using a dielectric coating rather than a metallic mirror coating. This causes the prism surfaces to act as a dielectric mirror. A well-designed dielectric coating can provide a reflectivity of over 99% across the visible light spectrum. This reflectivity is much improved compared to either an aluminum or silver mirror coating and the performance of the Uppendahl prism is similar to the Porro prism or the Abbe–Koenig prism.

The necessary mirror coating not only adds a manufacturing step, but it makes the Uppendahl roof prism lossier than the other image erectors using Porro prism or Abbe–Koenig prism that rely only on total internal reflections. A dielectric mirror coating is comparable in reflection effectivity, but makes the Uppendahl more expensive.

=== Phase correction ===
The Uppendahl furthermore shares the phase correction problems with other roof prisms. Uppendahl prism and other roof prism binoculars benefit from phase-correction coatings to minimize these problems and substantially improve resolution and contrast.

=== Maximal light transmission ===
In order to achieve maximum light transmission, the Uppendahl prism system should be provided with an anti-reflective coating on the incidence and exit surfaces. In addition, a high-quality dielectric mirroring and phase correction coatings should be used on both roof surfaces.
