= Leitz (surname) =

Leitz is a German and Dutch cognominal surname. It derives from the personal name Leutz, a pet form of any of various Germanic compound names formed with liut 'tribe, people'. Notable people with the surname include:

- Ernst Leitz II (1871–1956), German businessman and humanitarian
- Ernst Leitz I, father of Ernst Leitz II
- Elsie Kuehn-Leitz, daughter of Ernst Leitz II
- Nick Leitz (born 1996), American racing driver
- Christian Leitz (born 1960), German Egyptologist
- Louis Leitz (1846–1918), German mechanic and entrepreneur
