= Trinovid =

Type of binoculars

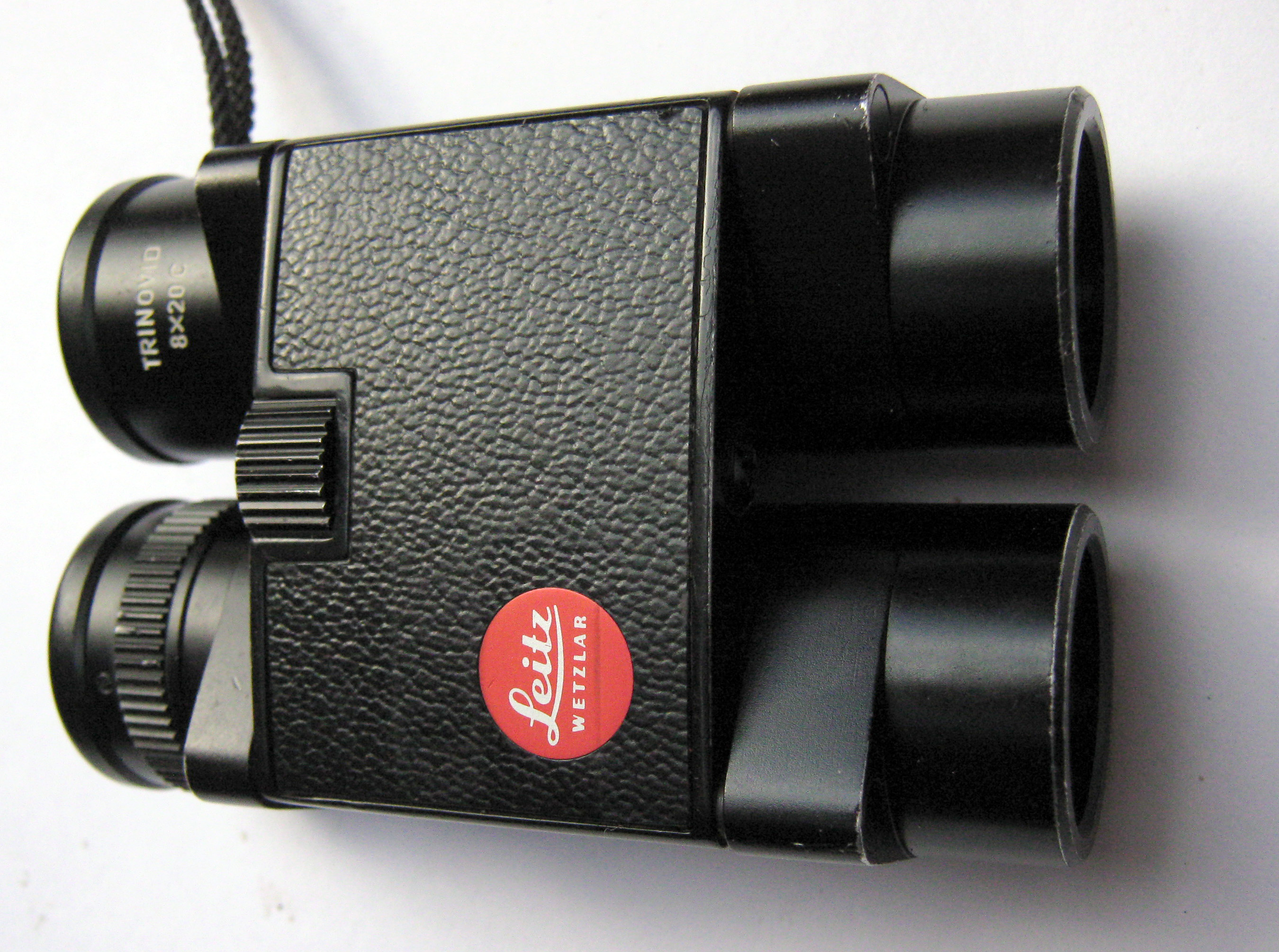
Leitz Wetzlar branded Trinovid 8×20 C folded

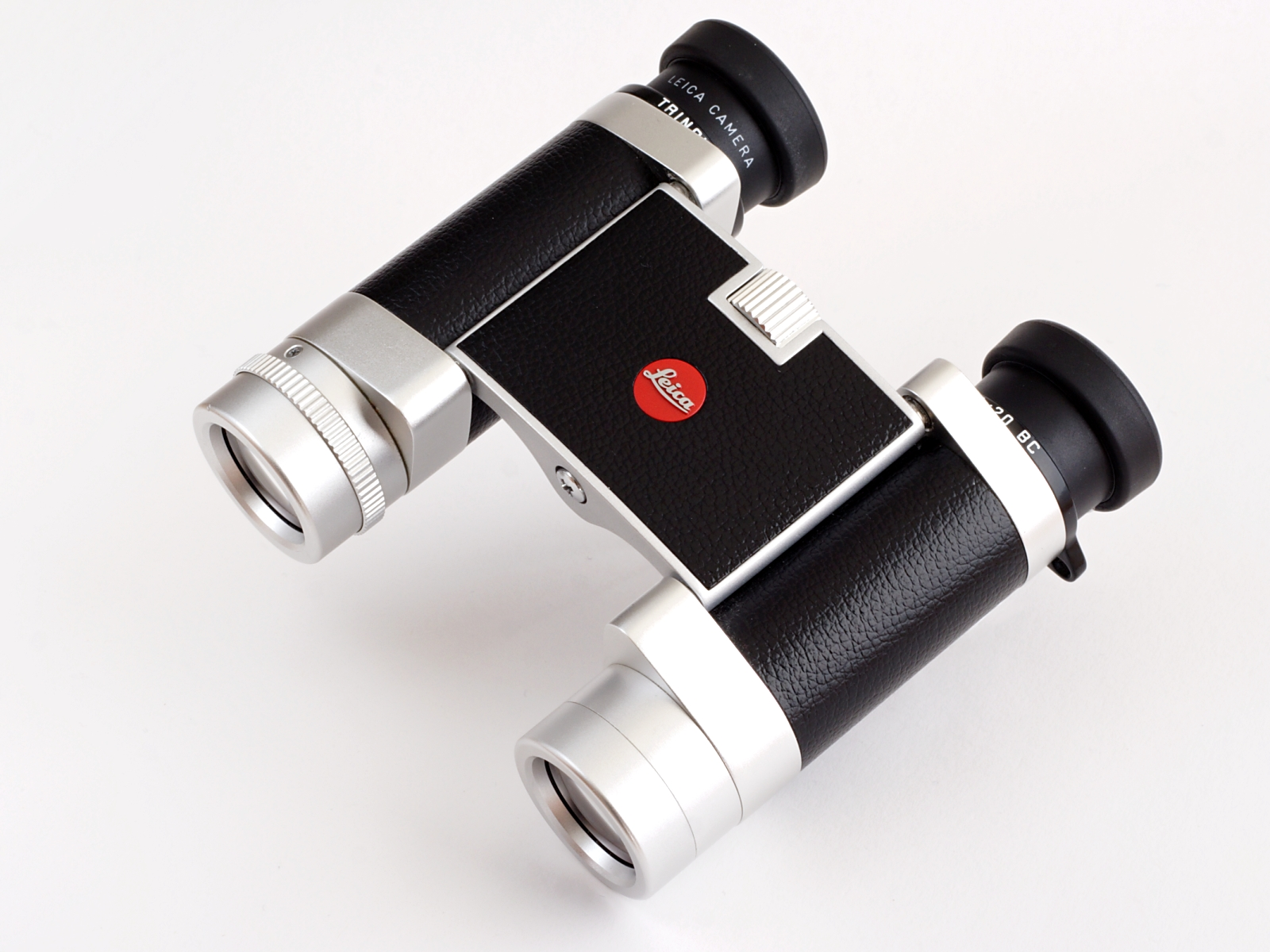
Leica branded Trinovid 8×20 BC expanded

Trinovid Compact binoculars

Trinovid is the protected model designation of a roof prism binoculars series from the company Leitz (optics) (since 1986 Leica Camera) based in Wetzlar, a German centre for optics as well as an important location for the precision engineering industry.

The Trinovid binoculars were introduced in 1958 based on a patent request filed in 1953 and featured:

1. special pentaprisms (so-called Uppendahl roof prism systems that allow the construction of compact optical instruments);
2. a built-in diopter adjustment, and
3. a fully internal focusing system, that moves internal optical lenses to prevent intrusion of dust and moisture into the binocular body with centrally located adjusting means to compensate for vision differences of the two eyes.

Because of these at the time three innovations in binoculars, the binoculars series was named Trinovid.

They included both larger and smaller (compact) binoculars and were initially practically unsuitable for people who wear glasses and weatherproof, but not waterproof. The binoculars series was updated and modified several times throughout its production history and switched to Schmidt–Pechan roof prism systems around 1990, which also brought a new series onto the market. These binoculars, which have been on the market for high-quality compact binoculars for a long time, had the optical parameters 8×20 and 10×25. The "B" designation added to updated models means that there is sufficient eye relief for eyeglasses [Brille in German] wearers. The Trinovid series were supplemented in 2004 by the Ultravid series and in 2016 by the Noctivid series with higher-quality optical glass, better optical coatings and completely recalculated optical imaging qualities, but are still available as the entry-level binoculars series offered by Leica.
