= Abbe–Koenig prism =

In this image, the bottom left and right corners of the prism are not needed and have been cut off to reduce weight.

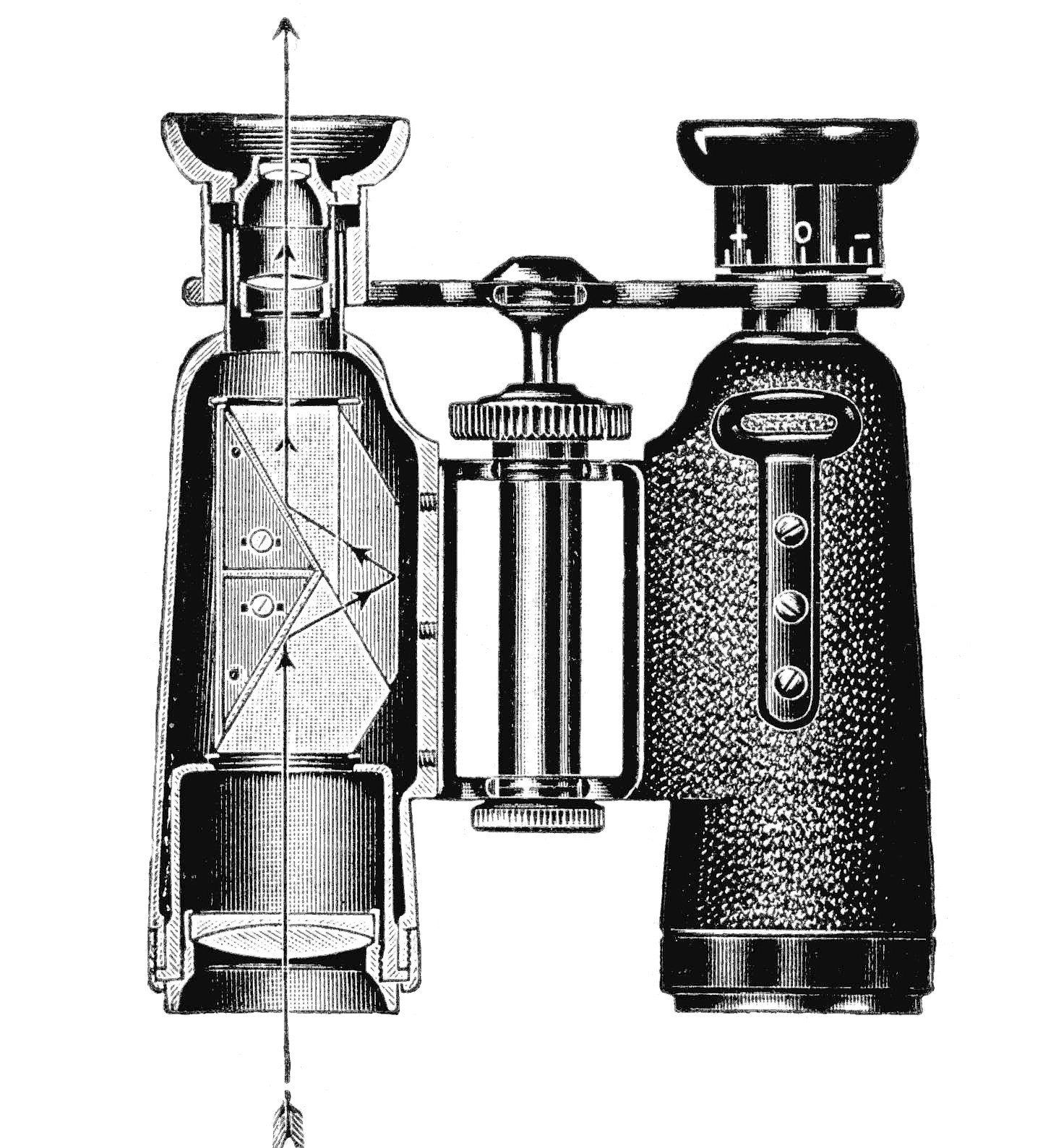
Binoculars diagram showing an Abbe–Koenig prism

An Abbe–Koenig prism is a type of reflecting prism, used to invert an image (rotate it by 180°). They are commonly used in binoculars and some telescopes for this purpose. The prism is named after Ernst Abbe and Albert Koenig.

The prism is made from two glass prisms, which are optically cemented together to form a symmetric, shallow Vee-shaped assembly. Light enters one face at normal incidence, is internally reflected from a 30° sloped face, and then is reflected from a "roof" (German Dach) section (consisting of two faces meeting at a 90° angle) at the bottom of the prism. The light is then reflected from the opposite 30° face and exits, again at normal incidence.

The net effect of the four internal reflections (two reflections are on roof plains) is to flip the image both vertically and horizontally. Since the light is reflected an even number of times, this produces a 180° image rotation (without changing the image's handedness and allows use of the prism as an image erecting system. Unlike the more common double Porro prism configuration, the Abbe–Koenig prism does not displace the output beam from the input beam, making it advantageous in some instruments. The prism is also less bulky than the double Porro design.

The prism is sometimes simply called a "roof prism", although this is ambiguous, because other roof prisms exist, such as the Amici and Schmidt–Pechan designs.

A variant of the Abbe–Koenig prism replaces the "roof" section of the prism with a single mirror-coated reflecting surface. This type of prism flips the image vertically, but not laterally, changing the handedness of the image to the opposite sense.

== Phase correction problem ==
The Abbe–Koenig prism shares the phase correction problems with other roof prisms. Abbe–Koenig prism and other roof prism binoculars benefit from phase-correction coatings to minimize these problems and substantially improve resolution and contrast.

== Commercial market share in binoculars ==
Abbe-Koenig prisms are significantly longer than Schmidt–Pechan prisms, and were and are rarely used except in large roof prism type binoculars, where light weight, compact size and cost are less important than ultimate light-gathering power. In the early 2020s the commercial market share of Abbe–Koenig prism type binoculars is relatively small compared to other prism designs.
