= Digiscoping =

Photographic technique

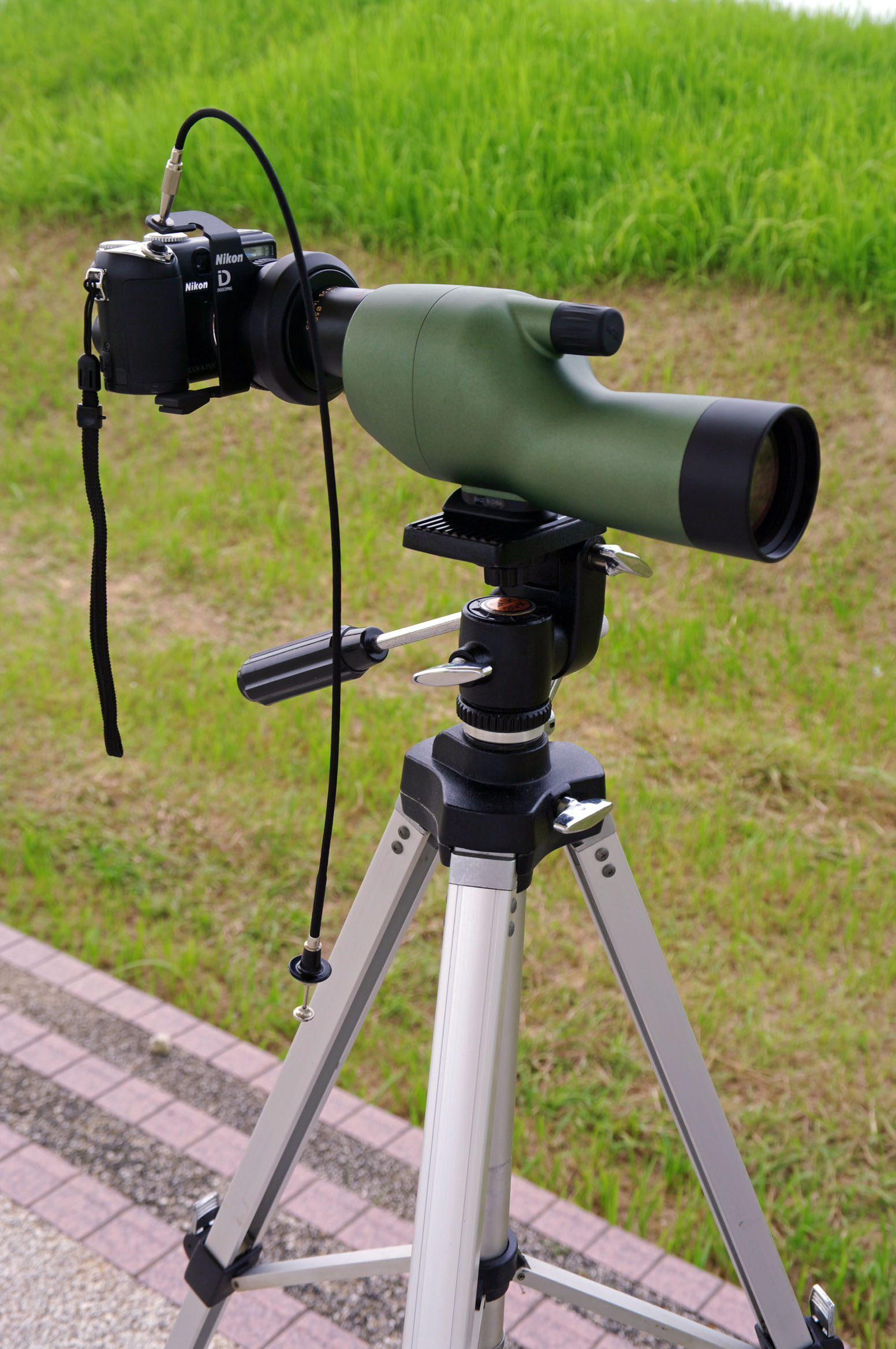
Spotting scope with a digital camera mounted afocally using an adapter.

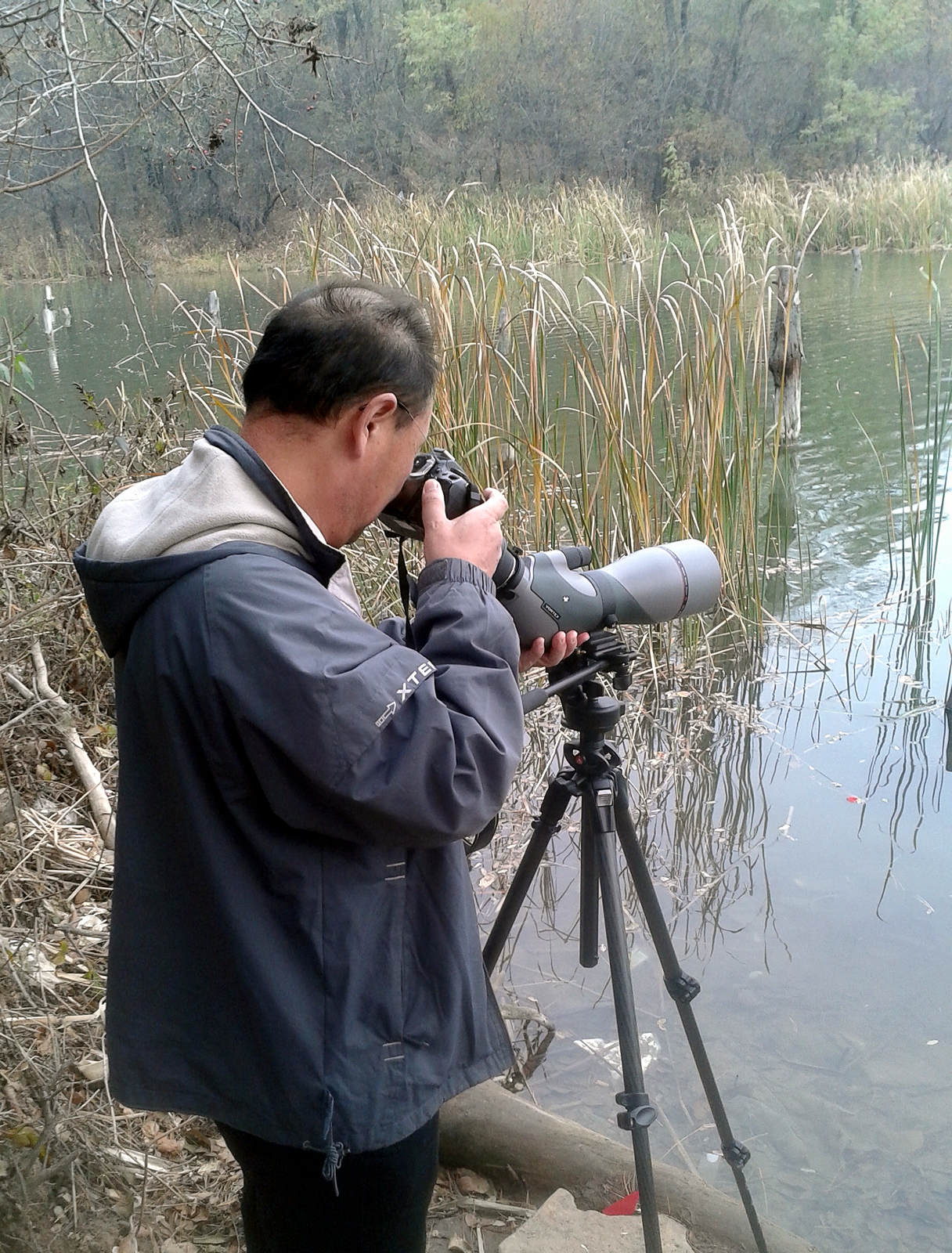
Digiscoping waterfowl

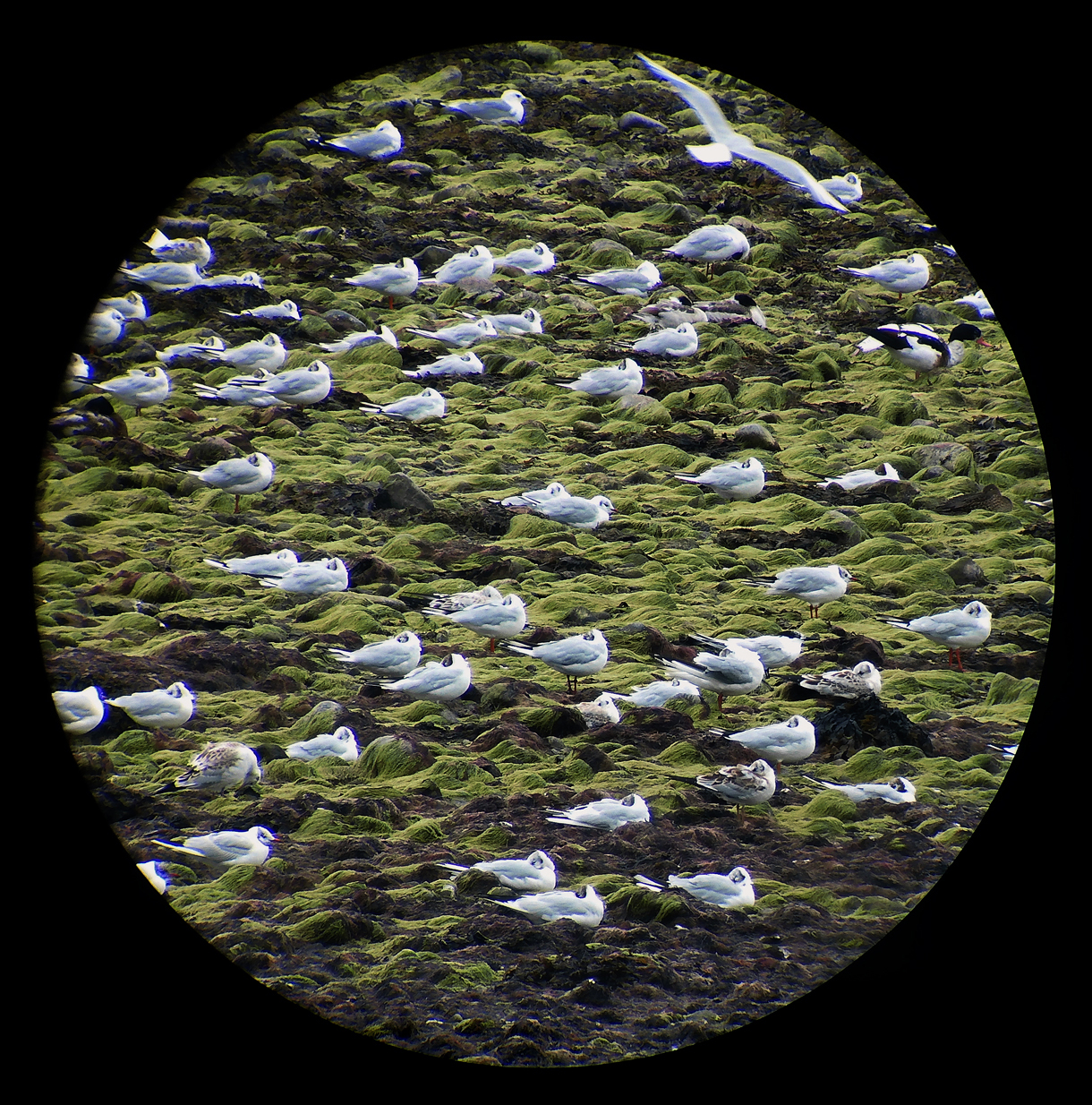
Typical uncropped digiscope image; the spotting scope has 20x magnification. Camera focal length is 24 mm; distance to the subject is about 90 meters.

Digiscoping is a type of afocal photography, using a digital camera to record distant images through the eyepiece of an optical telescope.

It commonly involves either a digital single-lens reflex camera with lens attached or, more often, a fixed-lens point and shoot digital camera, mounted to obtain photos through the eyepiece of a birdwatcher's spotting scope. The term has also been associated with the use of a digital camera and spotting scope equipped for prime focus photography.

== Origins ==
The portmanteau neologism digiscoping (= digital camera + telescope) was coined in 1999 by French birdwatcher Alain Fossé. Less notable neologisms for this activity are digiscope birding, digiscopy birding, digi-birding, digibinning (using digital camera with binoculars), and phonescoping (using a digital camera phone with a spotting scope or binoculars).

The origin of digiscoping has been attributed to the photographic methods of Laurence Poh, a birdwatcher from the Malaysian Nature Society, who discovered in 1999 almost by accident that the new generation of point and shoot digital cameras could be held up to the eyepiece of a standard spotting scope and achieve surprisingly good results. He spread his findings through birding internet discussion forums and one member, French birdwatcher Alain Fossé, coined the name digiscoping to describe the technique. Poh is sometimes credited with "inventing" the technique, although his contribution may be more along the lines of popularizing the idea and refining the technology.

Using a camera with its lens attached at the eyepiece of optical devices such as microscopes or telescopes, creating an afocal system (technically called afocal photography or afocal projection) has been used for nearly 100 years and digital camera afocal photography was already being employed in the amateur astronomical community. This form of afocal photography became more common in general photography in the 21st century with the spread of point and shoot digital cameras because of the ease of use of this type of setup. Several companies sell couplers and other devices for mounting digital cameras afocally.

== See also ==
- Wildlife photography
