= Ernst Leitz GmbH =

Defunct German corporation

Ernst Leitz GmbH was a German corporation based in Wetzlar, a German centre for optics as well as an important location for the precision engineering industry.

== History ==
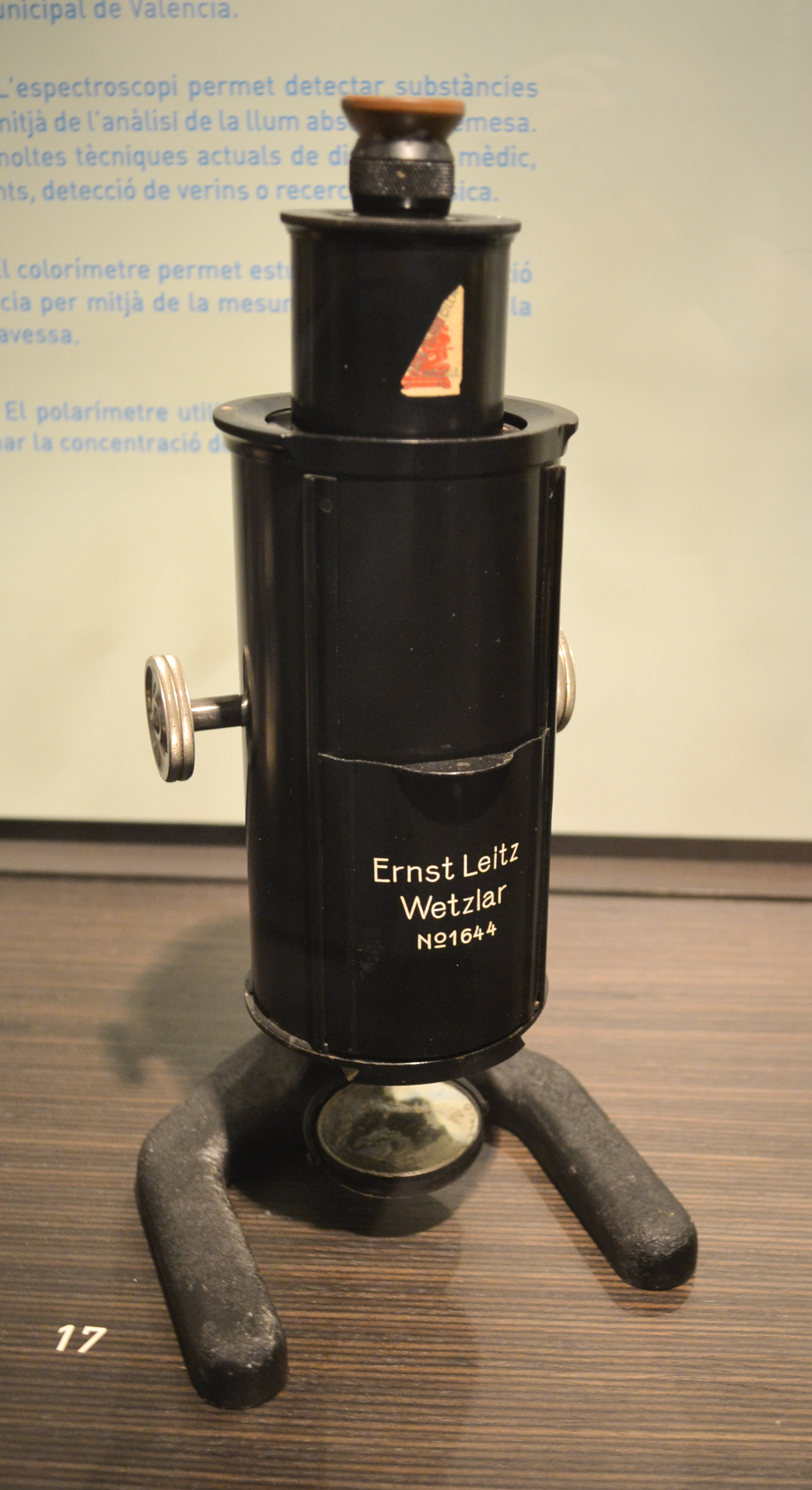
Kolorimeter

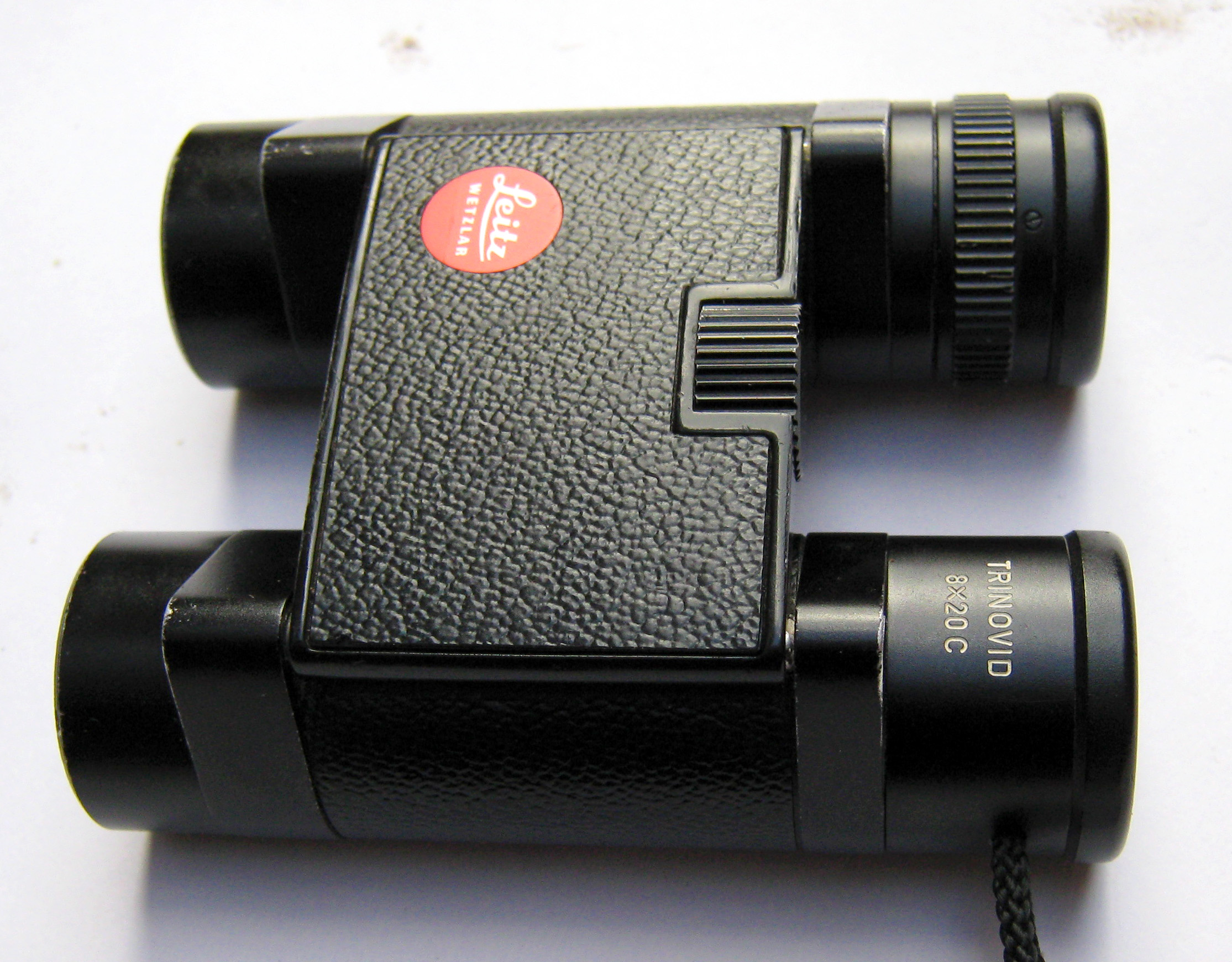
Leitz Wetzlar Trinovid 8×20 C binoculars expanded

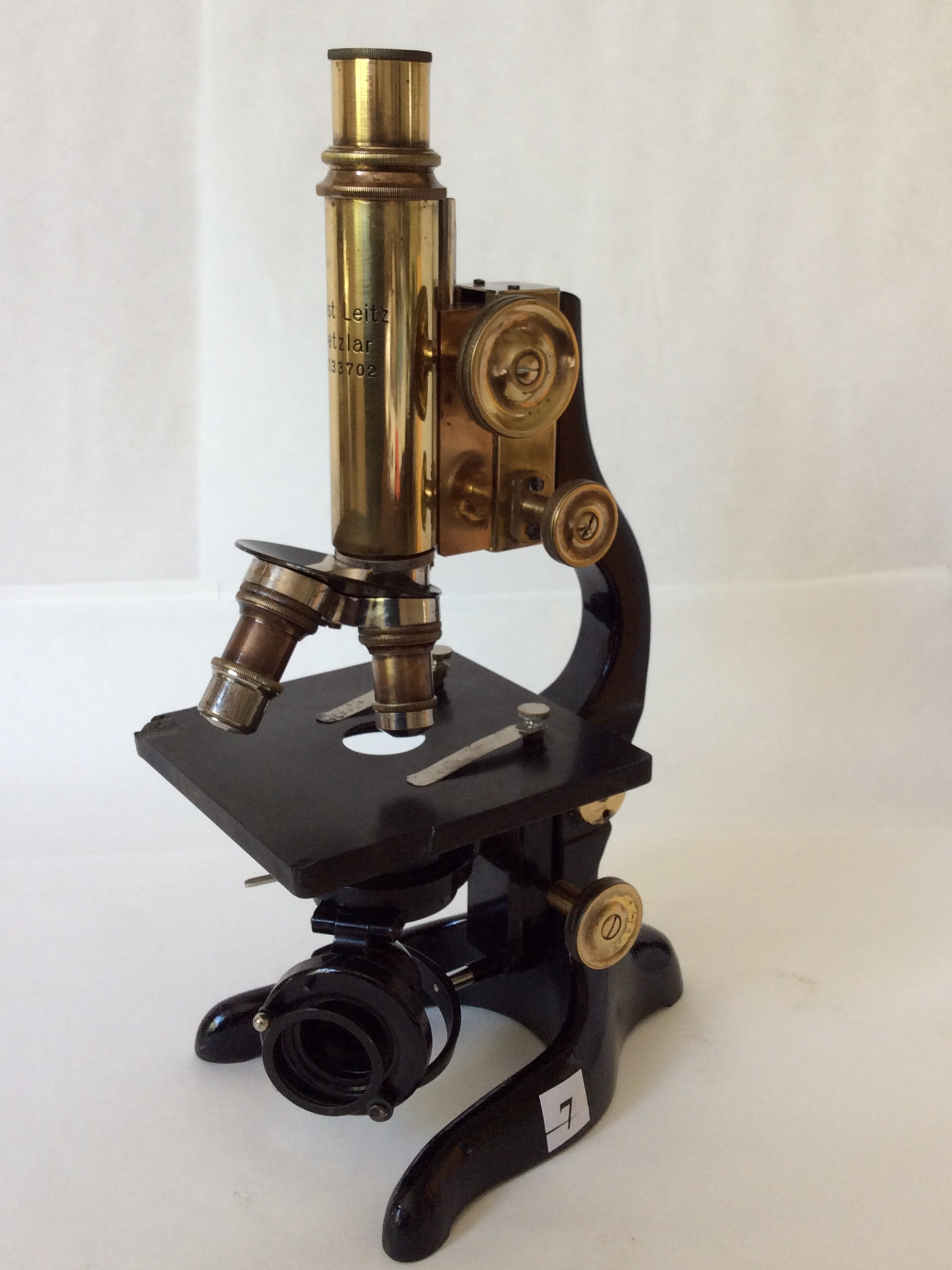
Leitz compound monocular microscope. Germany. 1922. Perea-Borobio Collection.

Carl Kellner, mechanic and self-taught mathematician, published his treatise Das orthoskopische Ocular, eine neu erfundene achromatische Linsencombination (The orthoscopic ocular, a newly invented achromatic lens combination) in 1849, describing a new optical formula he had developed. The ocular was capable of rendering an image with the correct perspective, free of the distortions typical of other microscopes at that time. Following his early death on 13 May 1855, his widow continued the business he had left behind, the Optisches Institut (optical institute).

The fine mechanic Ernst Leitz I (1843–1920) from Baden arrived at Wetzlar in 1864 and entered service at the Optisches Institut. He was trained as an instrument maker for physical and chemical apparatus and had several years' experience making watches in Switzerland. Initially, Leitz was a part shareholder of the business (in 1865), but took over as sole owner in 1869, and continued it under his own name. Leitz introduced serial production, raising sales volume rapidly after 1871. Consulting with his clients, he continued to refine the microscopes to their needs.

The microscopes were produced for biomedical as well as industrial purposes, including mineralogy. Leitz microscopes improved on other models of their day in several ways, including lighting and optics, particularly with orthoscopic eyepieces. By 1880, the company had reached an annual production numbering 500. In 1887, the 10,000th microscope was shipped, four years later the 20,000th, and in 1899, the 50,000th was completed. Bacteriologist Robert Koch was given the company's 100,000th microscope in 1907. Paul Ehrlich, inventor of chemotherapy, received the 150,000th one, and Nobel laureate Gerhard Domagk, discoverer of sulfonamides, the 400,000th Leica instrument.

By the end of the 19th century, the company had a worldwide reputation. Its product range by this point included several optical instruments besides microscopes. At the beginning of the new century, Leitz introduced eight-hour days and founded a health insurance society for employees. In 1913, it introduced a first fully functional binocular microscope. After the First World War, the economic situation of Leitz was dire. Ernst Leitz died in July 1920, and the leadership of the company passed to his son, Ernst Leitz II.

Around 1920, Leitz employed around 1400 people, and by 1956, 6000. In 1924 Ernst Leitz II decided that in spite of the weak economy, the apparatus designed by his employee Oskar Barnack should enter serial production.

As part of working on cinematic gear, Barnack had customized 35mm film for use in photographic cameras. Since he felt a ratio of 2:3 to be aesthetic, the resulting format was 24mm in height and 36mm wide. Around this, he constructed a camera designed for casual snapshots. This design formed the basis of the original Leica camera, as presented at the spring fair 1925 in Leipzig. The success of that camera was enormous and well beyond expectations.

In 1925, the first polarising microscope was made, and in 1931 the first comparative macroscope for criminological applications. In 1932, Leitz pioneered a fluorescent microscope, and three years later a photometer developed by Max Berek.

In the late 1930s, Ernst Leitz II assisted a number of Jewish employees in fleeing Germany. In 1942, Ernst Leitz GmbH employed a total of 195 foreign citizens. By January 1945, there were 989 forced laborers, 643 of them Ostarbeiter, predominantly from Ukraine, and 316 Westarbeiter from France and the Benelux.

Besides cameras and microscopes, Leitz developed further optical products that would define the mid-20th century, such as slide projectors of the "Prado" series, Leitz episcopes that were frequently used in schools and the Trinovid binoculars series.

One by one, the three sons (Ludwig, Ernst and Günther) of Ernst Leitz II began work at the company. Having remained intact through World War II, the production facilities could be restarted immediately after the war ended. In 1948, a separate development lab for optical glass was added, and from 1953, the design of microscope optics was computer-assisted. Upon the death of their father in 1956, the three sons jointly assumed leadership of the company.

== Successors ==
In the late 20th century the company was divided into four independent companies:

- Leica Camera, manufacturer of camera and sport optics equipment
- Leica Geosystems, manufacturer of geodetic equipment
- Leica Microsystems, manufacturer of microscopes and owner of the Leica brand
- Leica Biosystems, a cancer diagnostics company
