= Leica Freedom Train =

Rescue effort of Jews during the Holocaust

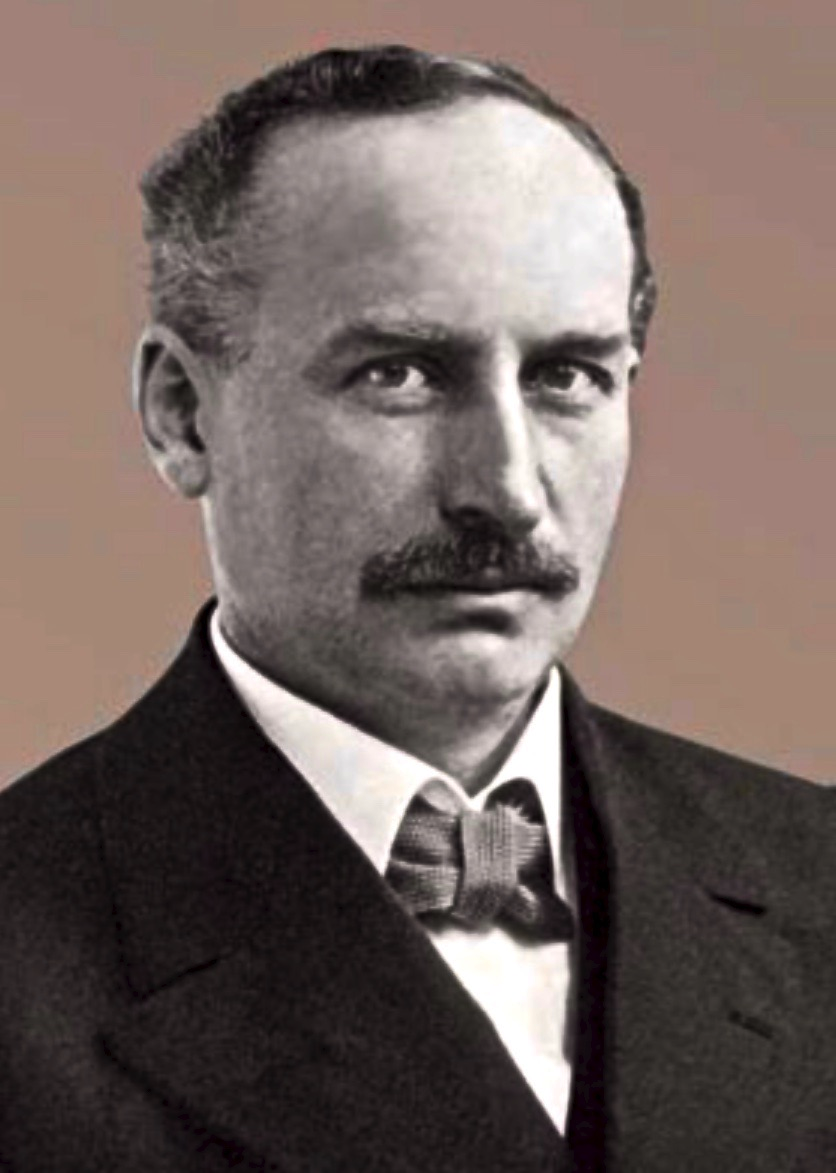
Ernst Leitz II (1871–1956), Industrialist and director of the Leitz Camera company (later Leica)

The Leica Freedom Train was a rescue effort in which hundreds of Jews were smuggled out of Nazi Germany before the Holocaust by Ernst Leitz II of the Leica Camera company, and his daughter Elsie Kuehn-Leitz.

== Background ==
Ernst Leitz's optics company, founded in Wetzlar in 1869, had a tradition of enlightened behavior toward its workers. Pensions, sick leave, health insurance—all were instituted early on at Leitz, which depended for its work force upon generations of skilled employees, many of whom were Jewish. As soon as Adolf Hitler was named chancellor of Germany in 1933, Ernst Leitz II, son of the founder and head of the company from 1920 to 1956, began receiving frantic calls from Jewish associates, asking for help to get them and their families out of the country. As non-Jews, Leitz and his family were unaffected by Nazi Germany's Nürnberg Laws, which restricted the movement of Jews and limited their professional activities.

== Rescue mission ==
To help his Jewish workers and colleagues, Leitz quietly established what has become known among historians of the Holocaust as the "Leica Freedom Train", a covert means of allowing Jews to leave Germany in the guise of Leitz employees being assigned overseas. Employees, retailers, family members, even friends of family members were "assigned" to Leitz sales offices in France, Britain, Hong Kong and the United States. Leitz's activities intensified after the Kristallnacht of November 1938, during which synagogues and Jewish shops were burned across Germany.

German "employees" disembarking from the ocean liner Bremen at a New York pier went to Leitz's Manhattan office, where they were helped to find jobs. Each new arrival was given a Leica camera. The refugees were paid a stipend until they could find work. Out of this migration came designers, repair technicians, salespeople, marketers, and writers for the photographic press. The "Leica Freedom Train" was at its height in 1938 and early 1939, delivering groups of refugees to New York every few weeks until the invasion of Poland on September 1, 1939, when Germany closed its borders.

Leitz was an internationally recognized brand that reflected credit on the newly resurgent Reich. The company produced range-finders and other optical systems for the German military. Nazi government urgently needed hard currency from abroad, and Leitz's single biggest market for optical goods was the United States.

Leitz's daughter, Elsie Kuhn-Leitz, was imprisoned by the Gestapo after she was caught at the border, helping Jewish women cross into Switzerland. She eventually was freed but endured rough treatment in the course of questioning. She also fell under suspicion when she attempted to improve the living conditions of 700 to 800 Ukrainian slave laborers, all of them women, who had been assigned to work in the plant during the 1940s. Similarly, Alfred Turk, a top executive at the company, was jailed for working to help Jews and freed only after the payment of a large bribe.

== Awards and commemoration ==
After the war, Elsie Kuhn-Leitz received numerous honors for her humanitarian efforts, among them the Officier d'honneur des Palmes Académiques from France in 1965, the Aristide Briand Medal from the European Academy in the 1970s, and the Courage to Care Award from the Anti-Defamation League. According to Norman Lipton, a freelance writer and editor, the Leitz family wanted no publicity for its heroic efforts. Only after the last member of the Leitz family was dead did the "Leica Freedom Train" finally come to light. It is the subject of a book, The Greatest Invention of the Leitz Family: The Leica Freedom Train (American Photographic Historical Society, New York, 2002) by Frank Dabba Smith, a California-born rabbi currently living in England. In 2007, Ernst Leitz II was awarded posthumously the Courage To Care Award by the Anti-Defamation League.
