= Relay lens =

Optical lens that transmits images

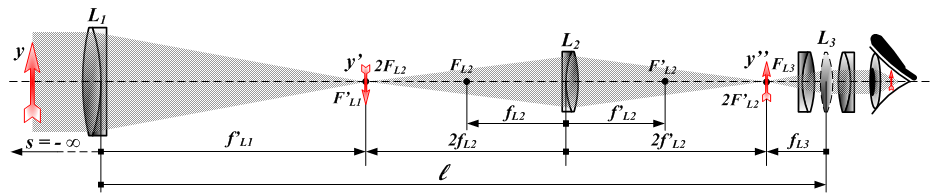
Cross-section of relay lens assembly - System 1

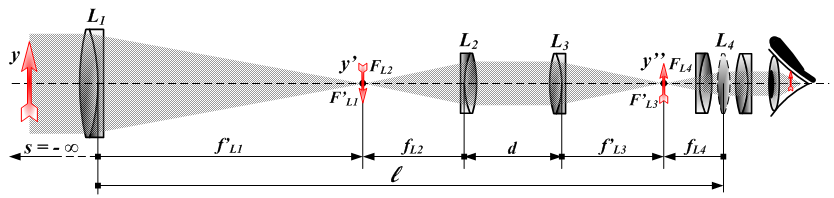
Cross-section of relay lens assembly - System 2

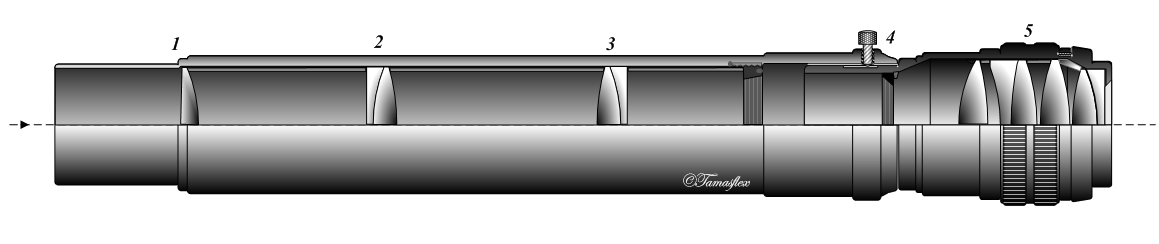
Image-erecting optical system for astronomical telescopes (erecting eyepiece)

In optics, a relay lens is a lens or a group of lenses that receives the image from the objective lens and relays it to the eyepiece. Relay lenses are found in refracting telescopes, endoscopes, and periscopes to optically manipulate the light path, extend the length of the whole optical system, and usually serve the purpose of inverting the image. They may be made of one or more conventional lenses or achromatic doublets, or a long cylindrical gradient-index of refraction lens (a GRIN lens).

Relay lenses operate by producing intermediate planes of focus. For example, in a SLR camera the zoom lens produces an image plane where the image sensor or photographic film would usually go. If you place another lens with focal length f at the distance 2f from that image plane and then put an image sensor at 2f beyond that lens, that lens will relay the first image to the second image with 1:1 magnification (see thin lens formula showing that with object distance $s=2f$ from the lens, the image distance from the lens is calculated to $s'=2f$). Ideally, this second image is the mirror image of the first image, so you could put an image sensor there and record the mirrored first image. If a longer distance is needed, this can be repeated. In practice, the lens will be an achromatic doublet.

In modern optical telescopes and telescopic sights with a dual-focal plane design, the objective image is typically already inverted upon reaching the relay lenses, and thus needed to be inverted again back into an erect image (i.e. "erecting" the image) before passing to the eyepiece, so the viewer actually sees an upright target. The relay lens group is the optical component responsible for that re-inversion, and therefore sometimes collectively called the erector lenses.

Also, for endoscope applications, where small tube diameter is desirable, most of the tube is filled with glass, with thin air gaps to allow for powered surfaces; because marginal ray angle is smaller at a given numerical aperture the higher the index of refraction, this allows the relay to have higher NA for a given diameter. These are known as Hopkins rod lenses.

Karl Storz GmbH licensed the patent for the Hopkins relay lens and introduced endoscopes including such lenses in 1965.

== See also ==
- Prism (e.g. Porro or roof prism)
- Catadioptric system
- Star diagonal
