= Ernst Leitz II =

German entrepreneur and humanitarian

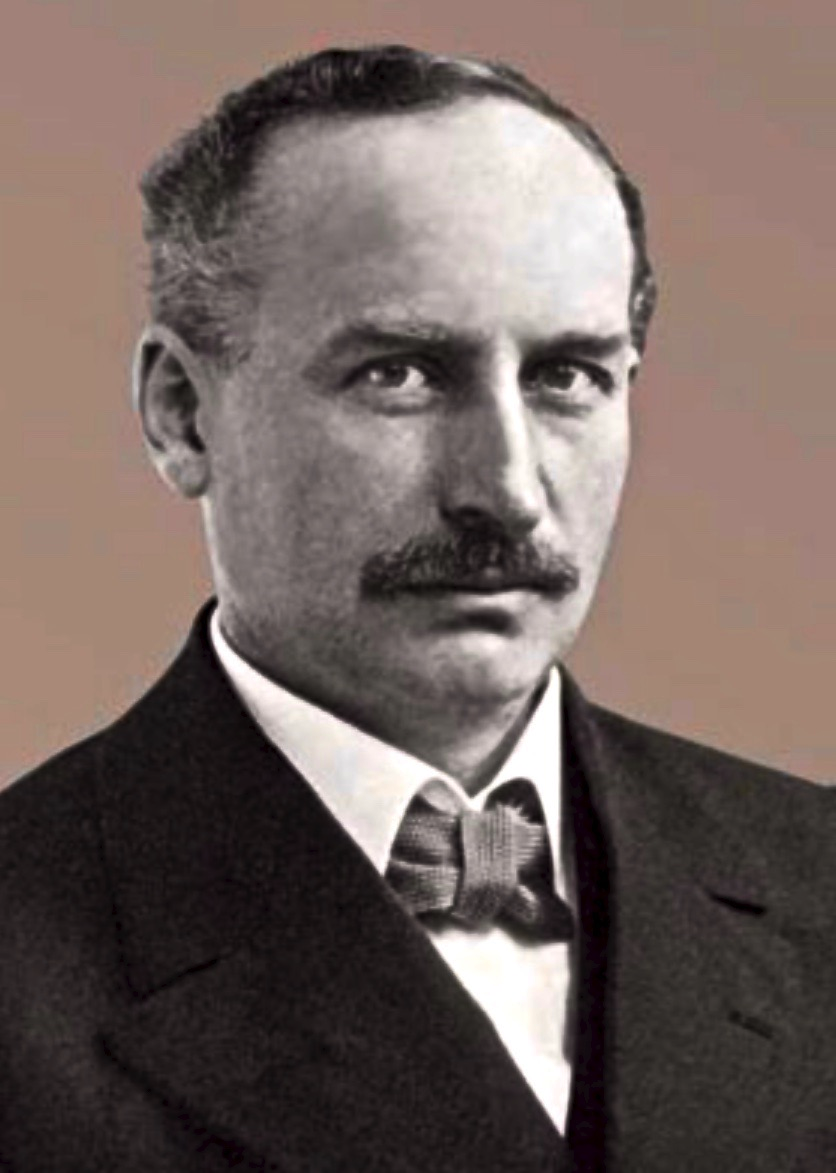
- Ernst Leitz II circa 1925
- Born: 1 March 1871; German Empire
- Died: 15 June 1956 (aged 85); West Germany
- Occupations: Entrepreneur; humanitarian
- Known for: Owner of Leica Camera
- Political party: German Democratic Party (1918-1933); Nazi Party (1942-1945)
- Children: 4
- Father: Ernst Leitz I

Ernst Leitz II (1 March 1871 – 15 June 1956) was a German business person and humanitarian. He was the second head of the optics company now known as Leica Camera and organized the Leica Freedom Train to allow people, most of whom were Jewish, to escape from Germany during Nazi times.

== Life ==
Ernst Leitz was the second son of the entrepreneur Ernst Leitz I. After an apprenticeship as a mechanic in his father's business and training as a merchant, Leitz joined the company as a partner in 1906 and became sole shareholder after his father's death in 1920.

Leitz initially devoted himself to the development of new microscopes, in particular the world's first binocular microscope that could also be used for high magnifications, which was launched in 1913. The large Leitz Ortholux research microscope with built-in illumination (1935) also became a great success.

The Leica, a 35 mm camera developed by Leitz's collaborator Oskar Barnack with the interchangeable lenses of Max Berek was distributed worldwide from 1925. It was a small, lightweight camera using 24 mm × 36 mm film rolls of 36 shots, establishing dynamic live photography.

Leitz continued his father's company's social policy by founding an employee support and pension fund and a company health insurance fund. With his father, he introduced the 8-hour workday as early as 1906, twelve years before it was required by law. While Jews were becoming economically and socially marginalised by the Nazi regime in the mid-1930s, Leitz offered lengthy apprenticeships and training programmes at his factory to Jewish people.

Leitz was a member of the left-liberal German Democratic Party (DDP) (later German State Party) and of the Reichsbanner Schwarz-Rot-Gold, an organization for the defense of the Weimar Republic. He stood as a candidate for the DDP in various Reichstag elections. It was not until 1942, at the age of 71, that he joined the Nazi Party in order to avert the threatened takeover of his company by the National Socialists.

The Anti-Defamation League, which campaigns against anti-Semitism, honored Leitz's humanitarian service with the "Courage to Care" award in 2007.

Leitz's three sons Ludwig, Ernst (III), Günther followed him as managing directors of the family business.

=== Entrepreneurial risk ===
With the words "I hereby decide: It will be risked", Leitz decided to launch the Leica 35-mm camera in 1924. This was his most significant entrepreneurial decision. Leitz recognized the trend toward compact, handy cameras at an early stage. This required the development of a new system for the 35 mm format (24 mm × 36 mm). World War I delayed the market launch of the new camera by ten years. German hyperinflation and the lack of interest on the part of the photographic trade in converting to the new technology hampered the market launch. However, Leitz saw an opportunity to give his workers secure employment during the Great Depression. Through his moral courage and his willingness to take risks (opening up a new market), Leitz laid the foundation for Leica's success.

=== Nazi period ===
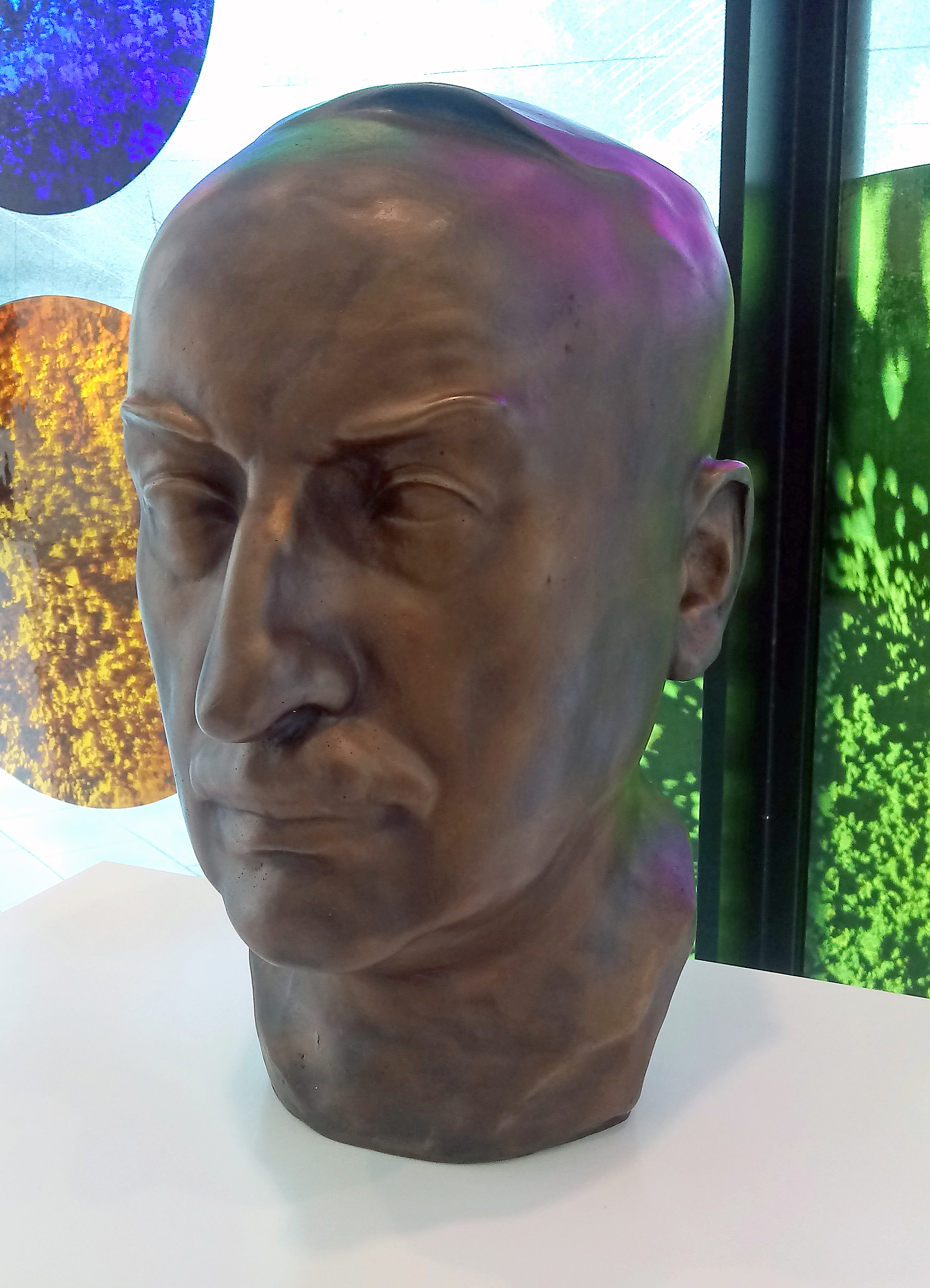
Ernst Leitz II (1871 - 1956)

Leitz was a leading democrat before the takeover of the country by the Nazis. He was one of the founders of the DDP in Wetzlar in 1918, was a democratic member of the city council, a DDP candidate for various Reichstag elections, and a member of the Reichsbanner Schwarz-Rot-Gold. He dressed the Wetzlar members of the Reichsbanner in uniforms at his expense, participated in parades in Wetzlar, and provided a Leitz truck to attend Reich meetings. His activities directed against the Nazis went so far that he appeared in public meetings and called them "brown monkeys."

For the new rulers, therefore, Leitz was an entrepreneur whose "politically unobjectionable attitude" did not guarantee that his company would be managed in accordance with their conception of the state.

Although Leitz enjoyed great public prestige as the manufacturer of the Leica, which was also used for propaganda purposes, he was particularly at risk from his political beliefs and his opposition to the proposed war. At stake was his ownership of the second largest optical factory in the German Reich and its possible role in manufacturing military optics. In such a case, the state leadership did not shy away from taking over a company that was important for the war. An example of this is Hugo Junkers, who, as an opponent of the regime, was forced to transfer ownership of his aircraft factories in Dessau soon after the seizure of power because he opposed the construction of military aircraft.

Within days of Adolf Hitler coming to power in 1933, Leitz began undertaking humanitarian efforts for those in the city of Wetzlar negatively affected by the Nazi regime like Jews. At considerable risk to himself and at the risk of his company's prestige, Leitz provided valuable assistance to or saved the lives of 86 people between 1933 and 1945, 68 of whom were persecuted on racial grounds. Most were Jews. He employed endangered Wetzlar Jews in his company immediately after the seizure of power and provided many of them with money and letters of recommendation to emigrate, especially to the USA. There, many persecuted Jews were employed in the company's New York branch until they could find other jobs. This process was later called The Leica Freedom Train in the United States. Leitz also never told his grandson Knut Kühn-Leitz about the Nazi era and certainly not about his help for the oppressed. For him it made no difference whether someone was Jewish or a political opponent of the Nazis; it was people he helped. With his relief actions he constantly provoked the new rulers.

After the end of World War II, it became known that the Nazi regime had intended to eliminate the "disgusting democrat". As early as 1938, the sales manager of Leitz company, Alfred Türk, was arrested for sending letters of recommendation to the New York branch for Jewish emigrants. In 1943, Leitz's daughter, Elsie Kühn-Leitz, was arrested for providing help for a Jewish woman from Wetzlar. Elsie was imprisoned for several months in the Gestapo prison in Frankfurt. Leitz was able to prevent her from being sent to a concentration camp.

== Awards ==
- 1912: Honorary doctorate from Justus Liebig University Giessen
- 1925: Honorary Senator of the Karlsruhe Institute of Technology
- 1941: Iron medal from the Senckenberg Nature Research Society
- 1941: Honorary Senator of the Technische Universität Darmstadt
- 1951: Honorary Senator of the University of Cologne
- 1952: Order of Merit of the Federal Republic of Germany
- Honorary doctorate of the Philipps University of Marburg
- 2007 (posthumous): Courage to Care Award of the Anti-Defamation League for his commitment to rescuing numerous persecuted Jews

With Ernst Leitz, a person stands among us who embodies the word citizen, who is also a guarantor for others, most vividly as an example.

— Federal President Theodor Heuss on the 80th birthday of Ernst Leitz

There were entrepreneurs who did everything to save Jewish employees and their families; great personalities and industrialists like Berthold Beitz, Robert Bosch, Ernst Leitz and Eduard Schulte.

— Interview with Arno Lustiger on rescue, Süddeutsche Zeitung No. 261, November 12–13, 2011
