= Schmidt–Pechan prism =

Optical prism used to rotate an image by 180°

A Schmidt–Pechan prism, side view (top) and 3D-view (bottom)

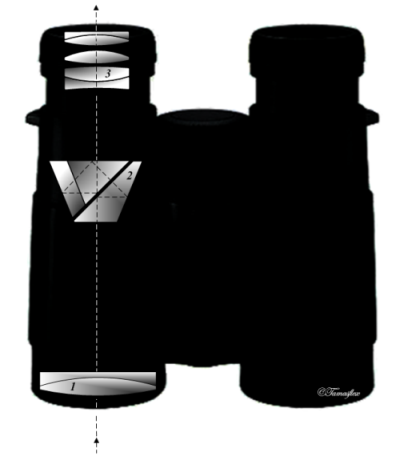
Binoculars diagram showing a Schmidt–Pechan prism

A Schmidt–Pechan prism is a type of optical prism used to rotate an image by 180°. These prisms are commonly used in binoculars as an image erecting system. The Schmidt–Pechan prism makes use of a roof prism section (from the German: Dachkante, lit. 'roof edge'). Binoculars designs using Schmidt–Pechan prisms can be constructed more compactly than ones using Porro or Uppendahl roof and Abbe–Koenig roof prisms.

A Schmidt–Pechan prism is sometimes called a Pechan prism pair.

== Method of operation ==
The Schmidt–Pechan is based on the Pechan prism design: Both are a composite of two prisms, separated by an air gap. Because of the air gap there are four glass/air transition surfaces. The Pechan design will invert or revert (flip) the image, depending on the orientation of the prism, but not both at the same time. For the Schmidt–Pechan design, the upper prism from the Pechan design is replaced with a Schmidt roof prism, so the Schmidt–Pechan prism can both invert and revert the image and so act as an image rotator. The lower prism is known as a half-pentaprism or Bauernfeind prism. The image's handedness is not changed by the Schmidt–Pechan.

The design of the two prisms is such that the entrance beam and exit beam are coaxial, i.e. the Schmidt–Pechan prism does not deviate the beam if it is centered on the optical axis. The "roof" section of the upper prism flips (reverts) the image laterally with two total internal reflections in the horizontal plane from the roof surface: once on each side of the roof. This latter pair of reflections can be considered as one reflection in the vertical plane. Both inversion and reversion together cause a 180° rotation of the image, but in doing so deviate the path by 45°. The lower prism corrects for this by interfacing the beam at 45° with the upper prism. The lower prism uses one total internal reflection, followed by a second reflection on the bottom surface to direct the beam into the second Schmidt prism. This second reflection in the lower prism happens at less than the critical angle, therefore the Schmidt–Pechan prism requires a reflective coating for this surface to be usable in practice. This is unlike other roof prisms, like the Abbe–Koenig prism, which uses total internal reflection on all reflective surfaces.

The net effect of the six reflections (two reflections are on roof plains) is to flip the image both vertically and horizontally.

== Problems ==
The Schmidt–Pechan roof prism is from a purely technical point of view a rather complicated roof prism design. Light entering the Schmidt–Pechan design reflects more times and less efficient than in the Abbe–Koenig prism design.

=== Glass–air transitions ===
All of the entry and exit surfaces must be optically coated to minimize losses, though the type of coating has to be carefully chosen as the same faces of the prism act both as entry faces (desiring good anti-reflection coating) and internally reflective faces (require a coating maximizing reflection). A paper, "Progress in Binocular Design", by Konrad Seil at Swarovski Optik shows that single-layer anti-reflective coatings on these surfaces maximized image contrast.

=== Reflection losses ===
As the incidence angle on the lower surface of the lower prism is less than the critical angle, total internal reflection does not occur. To mitigate this problem, a mirror coating is used on this surface. Typically an aluminum mirror coating (reflectivity of 87–93%) or silver mirror coating (reflectivity of 95–98%) is used.

The transmission of the prism can be further improved by using a dielectric coating rather than a metallic mirror coating. This causes the prism surfaces to act as a dielectric mirror. A well-designed dielectric coating can provide a reflectivity of more than 99% across the visible light spectrum. This reflectivity is much improved compared to either an aluminum or silver mirror coating and the performance of the Schmidt–Pechan prism is similar to the Porro prism or the Abbe–Koenig prism.

The necessary mirror coating not only adds a manufacturing step, but it makes the Schmidt–Pechan roof prism lossier than the other image erectors using Porro prism or Abbe–Koenig prism that rely only on total internal reflections. A dielectric mirror coating is comparable in reflection effectivity, but makes the Schmidt–Pechan more expensive.

=== Phase correction ===
The Schmidt–Pechan furthermore shares the phase correction problems with other roof prisms. Schmidt–Pechan prism and other roof prism binoculars benefit from phase-correction coatings to minimize these problems and substantially improve resolution and contrast.

== Commercial market share in binoculars ==
Despite complications from a purely technical point of view, Schmidt–Pechan prism type binoculars result in lighter, more compact and cheaper roof prism binoculars. In the early 2020s the commercial market share of Schmidt–Pechan prism type binoculars had become the dominant optical design compared to other prism type designs.
