= Roof prism =

Type of reflective prism

A roof pentaprism used in Single-lens reflex cameras; the lower right face is the roof (dach).

An Amici roof prism

A roof prism, also called a Dachkanten prism or Dach prism (from German: Dachkante, lit. "roof edge"), is a reflective prism containing a section where two faces meet at a 90° angle, resembling the roof of a building and thus the name. Reflection from the two 90° faces returns an image that is flipped laterally across the axis where the faces meet.

Characteristic for a roof prism is that the beam is split in half, with one half of the beam hitting first one face then the other face, while it is invert for the other half of the beam. Therefore, a roof prism can be used only with some distance to focal planes, or the "edge" of the roof would introduce slight distortions. Furthermore, the angle between the two faces has to be very close to 90°, or image quality would be degraded.

The simplest roof prism is the Amici roof prism, with other common roof prism designs being the Abbe–Koenig prism, the Schmidt–Pechan prism and probably the best known being the roof pentaprism (pictured right).

A Porro prism is not a roof prism contrary to popular notion, as the Porro prism's two 90° faces usually don't meet and therefore don't form a roof edge.

== Phase correction ==
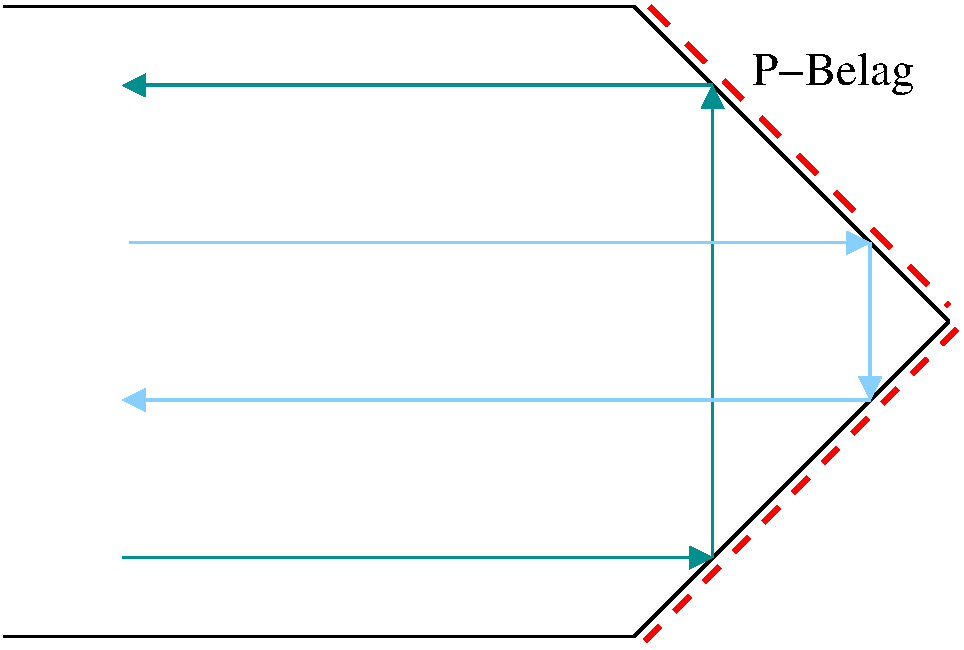
Beam path at the roof edge (cross-section); the P-coating layer is on both roof surfaces

The multiple internal reflections cause a polarization-dependent phase-lag of the transmitted light, in a manner similar to a Fresnel rhomb. This must be suppressed by multilayer phase-correction coatings applied to one of the roof surfaces to avoid unwanted interference effects and a loss of contrast in the image. Dielectric phase-correction prism coatings are applied in a vacuum chamber with maybe thirty or more different superimposed vapor coating layers deposits, making it a complex production process.

In a roof prism without a phase-correcting coating, s-polarized and p-polarized light each acquire a different geometric phase as they pass through the upper prism. When the two polarized components are recombined, interference between the s-polarized and p-polarized light results in a different intensity distribution perpendicular to the roof edge as compared to that along the roof edge. This effect reduces contrast and resolution in the image perpendicular to the roof edge, producing an inferior image compared to that from a porro prism erecting system. This roof edge diffraction effect may also be seen as a diffraction spike perpendicular to the roof edge generated by bright points in the image. In technical optics, such a phase is also known as the Pancharatnam phase, and in quantum physics an equivalent phenomenon is known as the Berry phase.

This effect can be seen in the elongation of the Airy disk in the direction perpendicular to the crest of the roof as this is a diffraction from the discontinuity at the roof crest.

The unwanted interference effects are suppressed by vapour-depositing a special dielectric coating known as a phase-compensating coating on the roof surfaces of the roof prism. These phase-correction coating or P-coating on the roof surfaces was developed in 1988 by Adolf Weyrauch at Carl Zeiss Other manufacturers followed soon, and since then phase-correction coatings are used across the board in medium and high-quality roof prism binoculars. This coating corrects for the difference in geometric phase between s- and p-polarized light so both have effectively the same phase shift, preventing image-degrading interference.

From a technical point of view, the phase-correction coating layer does not correct the actual phase shift, but rather the partial polarization of the light that results from total reflection. Such a correction can always only be made for a selected wavelength and for a specific angle of incidence; however, it is possible to approximately correct a roof prism for polychromatic light by superimposing several layers. In this way, since the 1990s, roof prism binoculars have also achieved resolution values that were previously only achievable with porro prisms. The presence of a phase-correction coating can be checked on unopened binoculars using two polarization filters.
