= Leica Camera =

German optics company

Coordinates: 50°33′9″N 008°32′11″E

Leica Camera AG
- Type: Aktiengesellschaft
- Industry: Cameras, digital imaging, home entertainment, optical instruments, photography, photographic equipment
- Founded: 1869 in Wetzlar, Germany (Ernst Leitz Wetzlar); 1986 in Solms, Germany (Leica)
- Headquarters: Wetzlar, Germany
- Key people: Andreas Kaufmann (Chairman, Supervisory board), Andreas Voll (CEO)
- Products: Cameras, photographic lenses, ophthalmic lenses and other optical equipment, watches, mobile phones, 4K projectors, Rangefinder camera, still cameras, SLR cameras, DSLR cameras, binoculars / monoculars, binocular telescope, laser rangefinder ophthalmic lenses
- Revenue: ▲€596 million
- Owner: ACM Projektentwicklung GmbH (55%); The Blackstone Group (45%)
- Number of employees: 2300
- Website: leica-camera.com

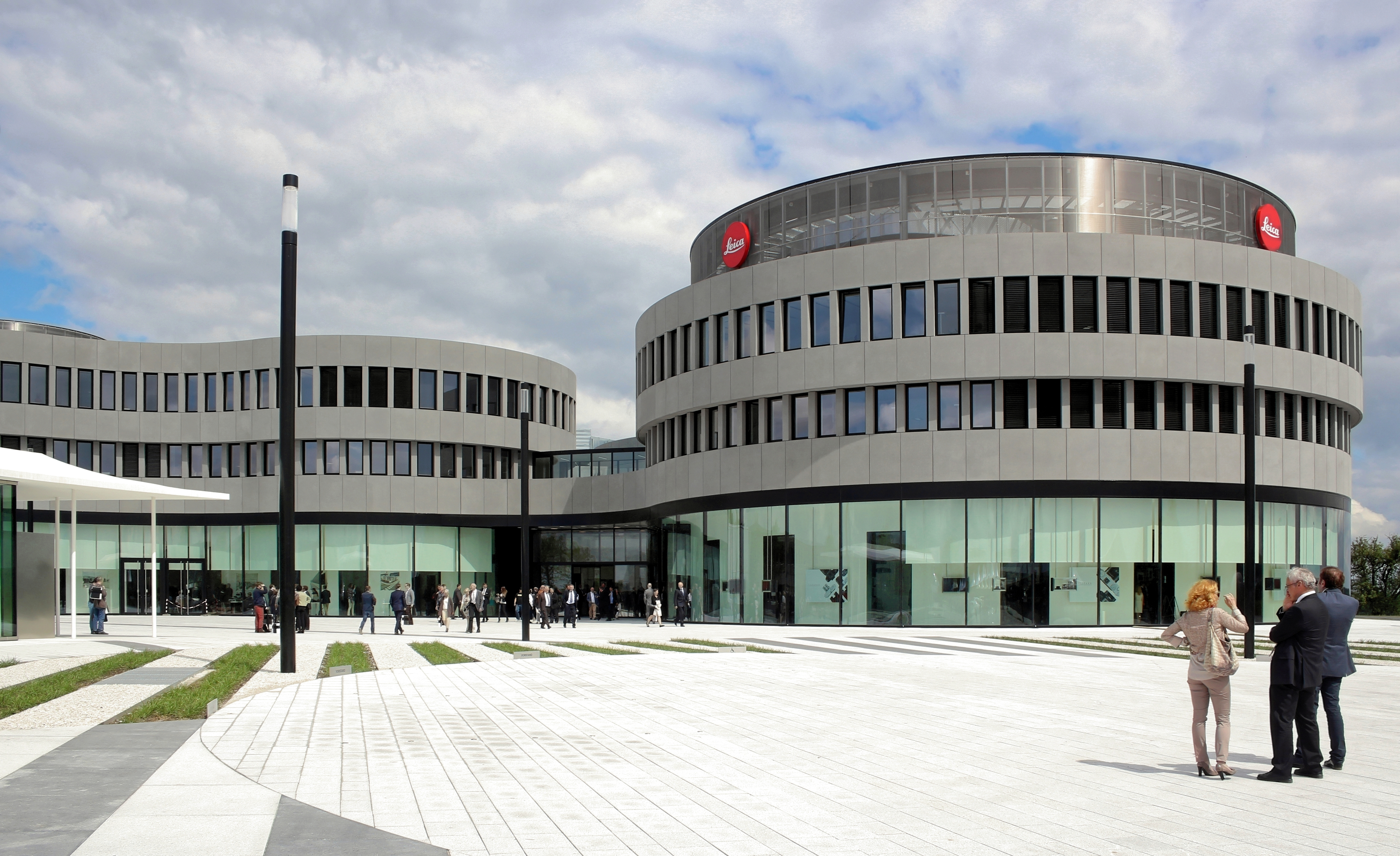
Headquarters in Wetzlar, since 2014

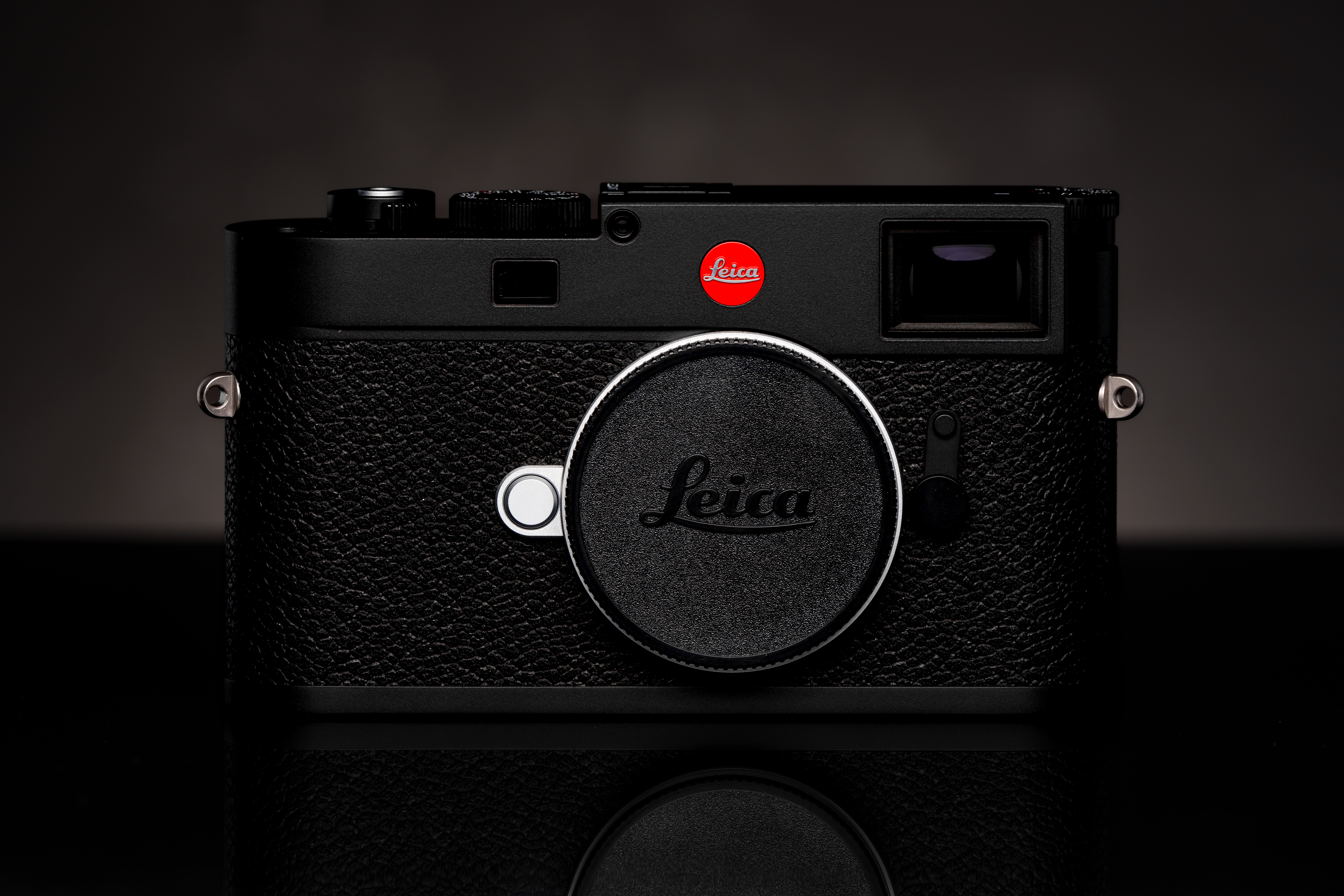
Leica M11

Leica Camera AG (/ˈlaɪkə/) is a German manufacturer of cameras, optical lenses, photographic lenses, binoculars, and rifle scopes. The company is also active in the field of spectacle lenses, mechanical watches, smartphones and accessories, as well as in the manufacture of projectors for home cinemas. Leica developed the first 35mm cameras and later expanded into digital photography.

The company's origins date back to 1869, when Ernst Leitz took over the Optical Institute founded by Carl Kellner in 1849. Leica has existed in its current form since 1986, after its photography activities were consolidated into Leica GmbH. The name Leica is derived from the first three letters of the founder's surname (Leitz) and the first two of the word camera: lei-ca (LEItz CAmera).

Leica Camera AG is 55% owned by Austrian investment firm ACM Projektentwicklung GmbH and 45% owned by The Blackstone Group which licenses the Leica brand name from the Danaher Corporation-owned Leica Microsystems GmbH.

The company promotes photographic culture. This includes around 30 Leica galleries, the Leica Academies and international awards such as the Leica Hall of Fame Award and the Leica Oskar Barnack Award (LOBA).

In addition to its headquarters in Wetzlar (Germany), Leica operates another production site in Vila Nova de Famalicão (Portugal). Leica maintains a global distribution network with around 120 Leica stores and employs approximately 2,300 people worldwide. Turnover amounted to €596 million in 2024/25.

Leica has also expanded its influence through collaborations with Panasonic, providing optical designs for Lumix cameras, and with Huawei, Xiaomi, contributing camera technology to the brands' smartphones. The company maintains a strong presence in the luxury photography market, offering limited-edition models in partnership with brands such as Hermès and Zagato.

== Company structure ==
Leica Camera AG is the parent company of the Leica Camera Group, headquartered in Wetzlar, with an additional production site in Vila Nova de Famalicão. The company holds 24 direct and 15 indirect shareholdings in companies across Europe, North America, Asia and Australia. As of 2026, the company operates its own sales subsidiaries with around 120 Leica Stores internationally.

Leica employs around 2,300 people and generated revenue of €596 million in the 2024/25 financial year.

== Business divisions and products ==
=== Cameras ===
The earliest Leica prototypes were developed by the company Ernst Leitz GmbH during the first years of the 20th century, but marketing did not commence until the mid-1920s. The Leicas were innovative, by orienting the image frame sideways for the 35 mm film as opposed to the cine-camera tradition of across the film strip. The cameras were compact with collapsible lenses, for hiking and biking. The rangefinder feature was added to the Leica II in 1932, and that year both rangefinder and viewfinder cameras became available with interchangeable lenses. In 1933 the Leica III offered slow-speed shutter controls and a fast 1/1000 s shutter speed, and various iterations of the III (a,b,c,d,f,&g) series became the flagship models and best sellers into the late 1950s. Further iterations of models I and II were offered but did not sell well.

Prior to WWII, Leica and competing Contax cameras from Zeiss Ikon were considered to be the finest 35 mm cameras, but post-WWII the companies had competition from Soviet and Japanese copies. During the 1950s Japanese quality and innovation, along with low pricing, devastated the European camera industry. Leica became an expensive type of camera bought largely by professional or serious photographers. However, the advent of reflex camera technology made rangefinders somewhat obsolete, leaving Leica the main product of a diminishing market segment. Leica has remained a notable tradename into the 21st Century.

==== Scan camera S1 ====
In 1996, Leica introduced the professional scanning camera system S1. The first model, the S1 Pro, was designed for stationary studio and reprographic use and was aimed primarily at museums, archives and research institutions. Around 160 units were produced, and the system was distributed worldwide by Leica and specialist dealers. In 1998, additional variants were introduced, including a lower-priced version and a model designed for faster image capture.

==== Leica M ====
The Leica M system is Leica’s longest-established camera line and is offered in both digital and analogue form. Current digital and analogue models include the M11 series and the M6, which returned to production after a temporary discontinuation. In addition to the standard models, Leica offers variants for specific photographic applications, including monochrome-only cameras and models without a rear display.

In October 2024, Leica released the Leica M Edition 70, a 250-unit anniversary edition. This set includes a platinum-coated Leica M-A 35 mm film camera with Leicavit fast advance, a 50 mm APO-Summicron-M f/2 lens and a platinum-coated film container with black-and-white film.

As of 2026, the following models are available:

- M11-D
- M11-P
- M11 Monochrom
- M EV1
- MP
- M-A (Type 127)
- M6 (as a revised edition)

==== Leica SL, Leica Q and others ====
The Leica SL system, introduced in 2015, consists of mirrorless full-frame system cameras aimed primarily at professional users. The cameras are based on the L-Mount standard, developed by Leica, which allows the use of cameras and lenses across multiple manufacturers within the L-Mount Alliance, including Leica, Sigma and Panasonic, among others. As of 2026, the Leica SL3, SL3-S and SL3-P are available.

The Leica Q series consists of compact full-frame cameras with a fixed lens. As of 2026, Leica offers the Q3, Q3 Monochrom and Q3 43.

In addition to its main systems, Leica offers further camera models in the compact and instant camera segments. These include the D-Lux series, developed in cooperation with Panasonic, and the instant camera Leica Sofort, which combines analogue instant photography with digital functions.

=== Sport optics ===
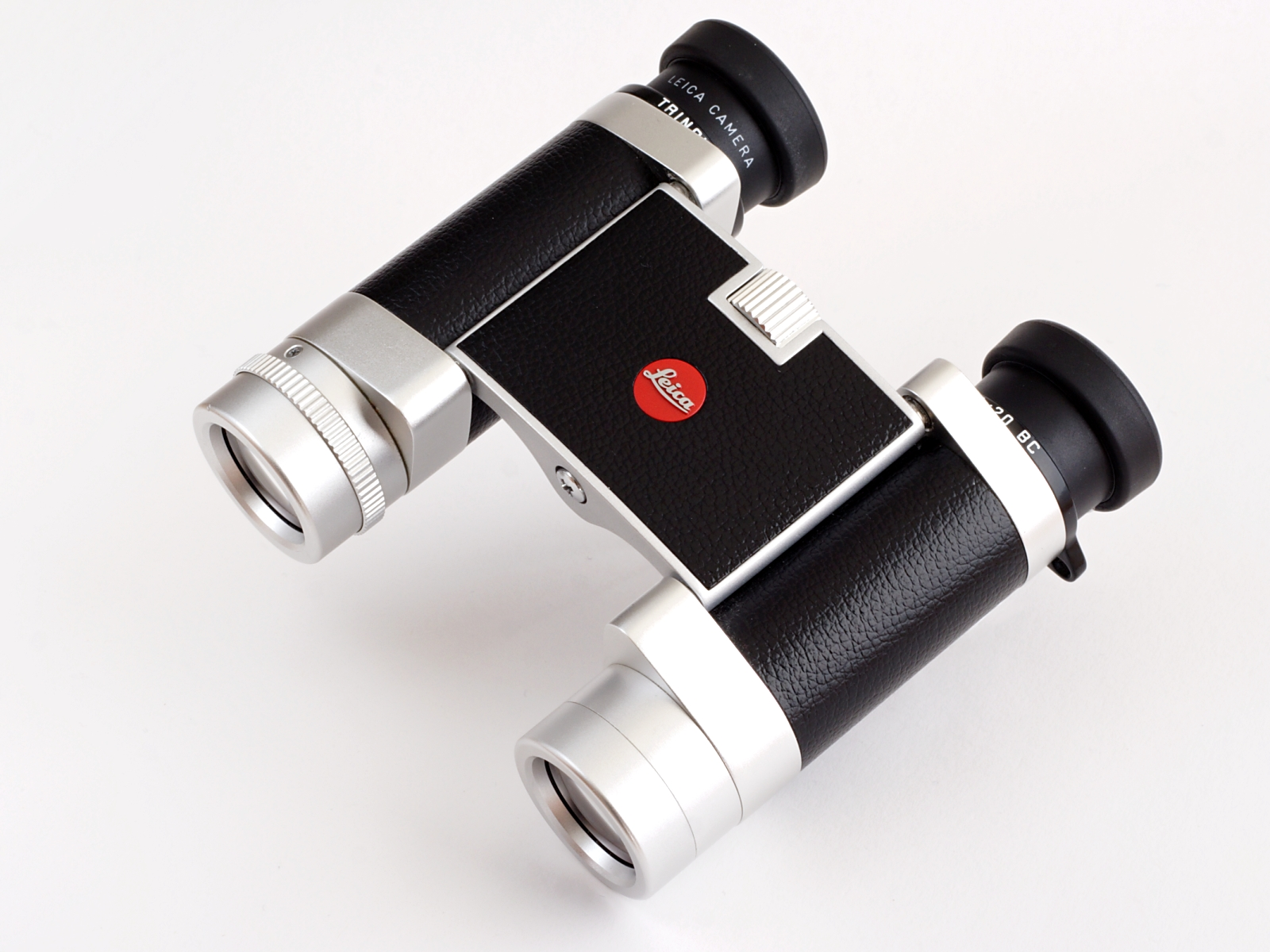
Leica Trinovid 8 × 20 BC

In the field of sports optics, Leica is active in the development, manufacture, and distribution of binoculars, rangefinders, spotting scopes, rifle scopes, thermal imaging technology and related accessories. All the lenses offered are nitrogen-filled, meaning they cannot fog up from the inside, and are pressure-resistant to a depth of five metres. The rubber armouring is permanently bonded to the metal housing, ensuring that even under heavy strain the parts cannot separate. Magnesium is also used as the housing material.

The range of binoculars includes the Noctivid, Ultravid and Trinovid lines, among others. Leica rifle scopes feature a large field of view with uniform sharpness right to the edge of the image. They offer high image resolution, light transmission of over 90 per cent and a user-friendly exit pupil.

Leica introduced its first prism binoculars, the Binocle 6×18, in 1907. Production was discontinued in 1931 for economic reasons. Binocular manufacturing resumed in the mid-1960s with the introduction of the Trinovid series, which offered improved optical performance. A monocular Trinovid was later developed for NASA’s Apollo program and became known as the "Eye of Apollo".

In 1992, Leica launched the Geovid, the world's first binoculars with an integrated rangefinder.

=== Mobile ===
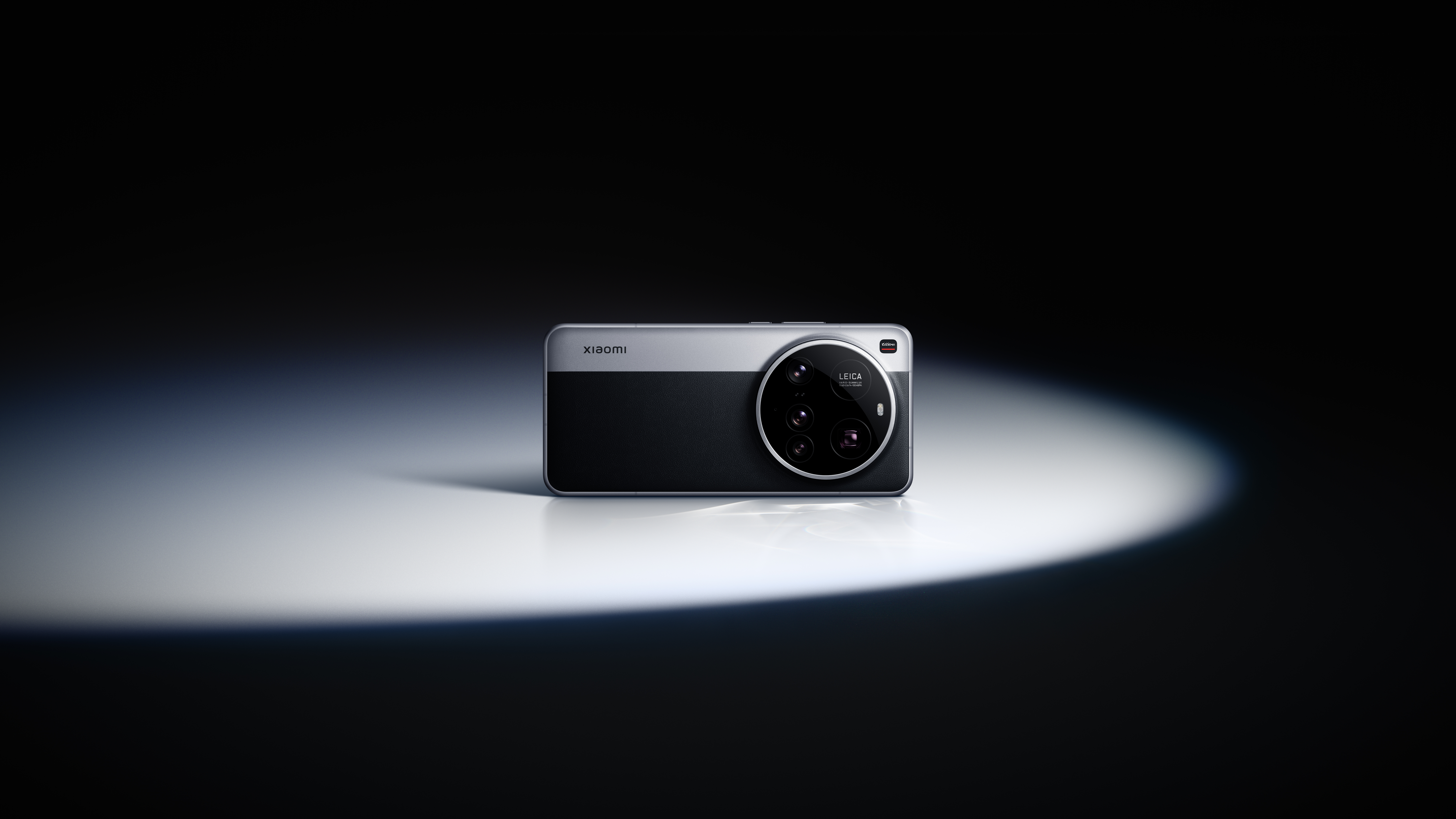
Xiaomi 15 Ultra with Leica camera

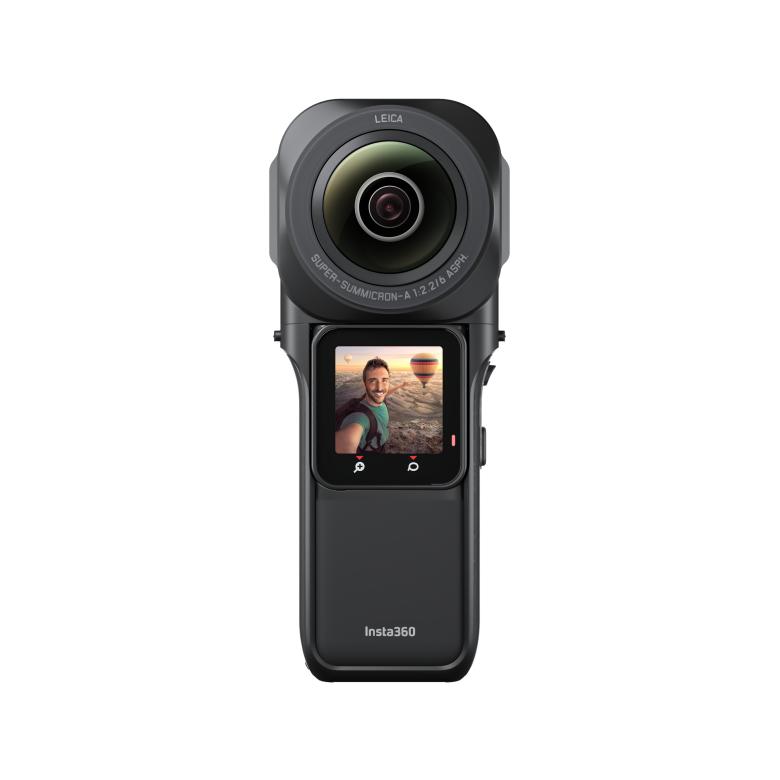
Insta360 ONE RS 1-Inch 360 co-engineered with Leica

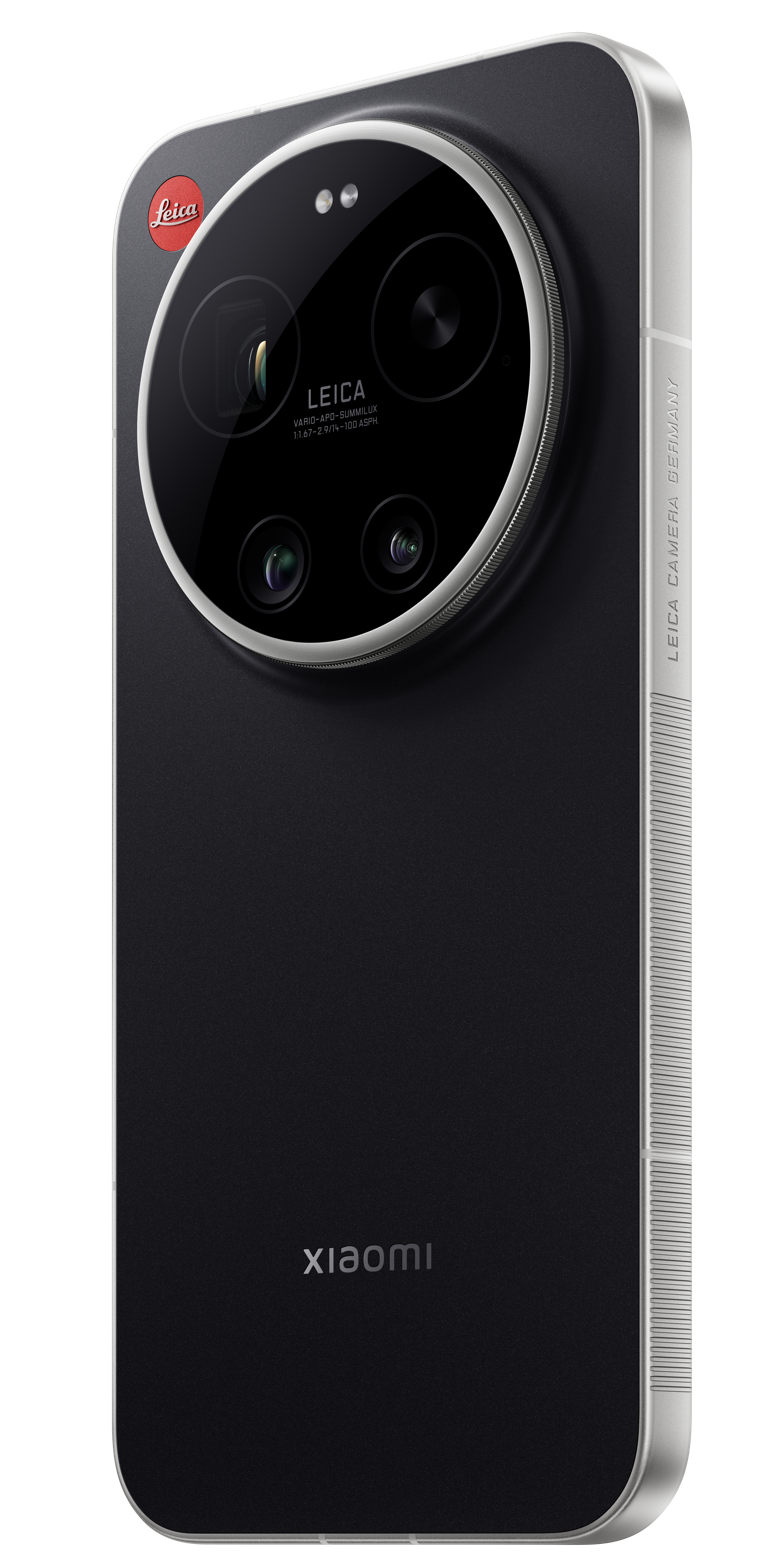
Leica Leitzphone powered by Xiaomi

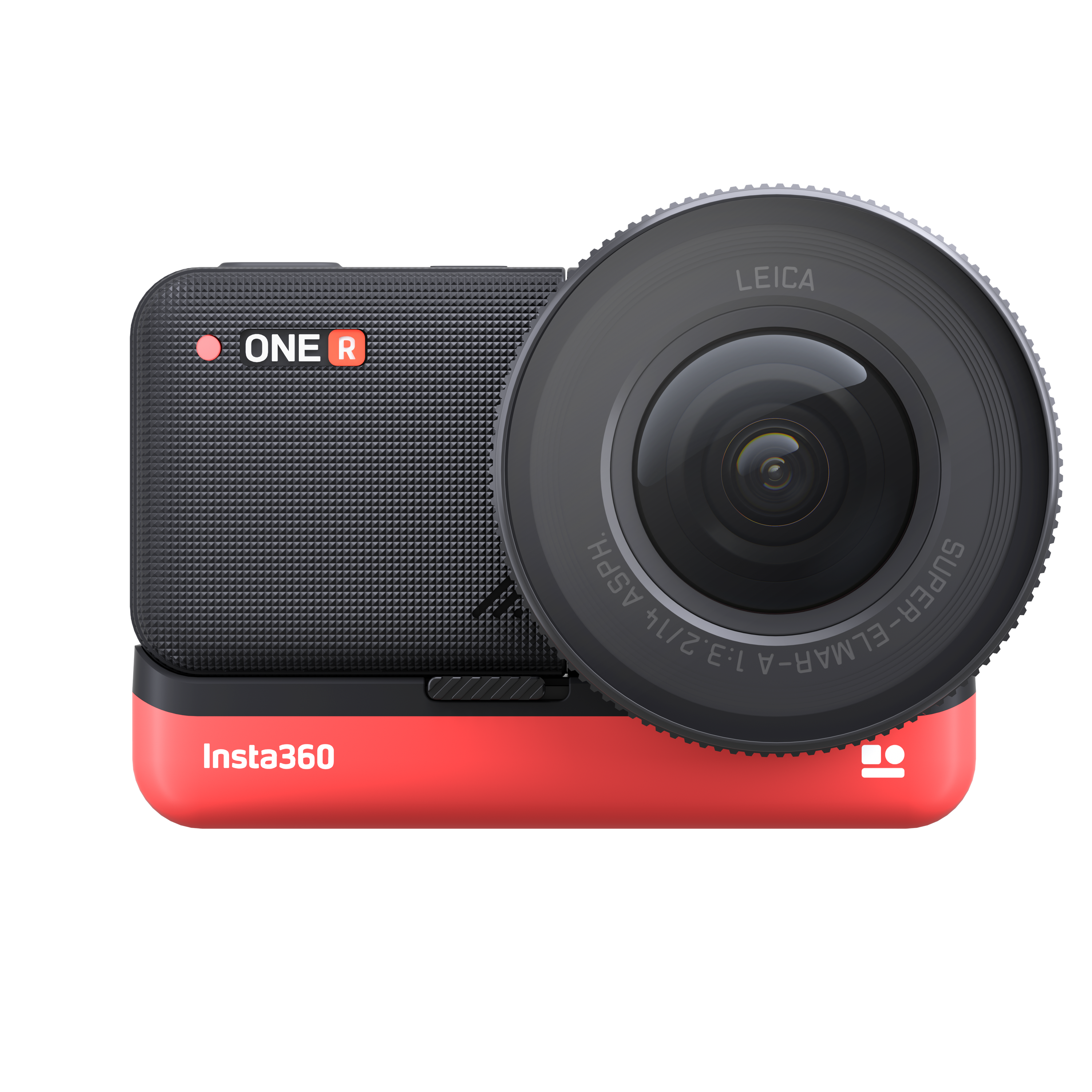
Insta360 ONE R

The Mobile division of Leica Camera AG includes the company's activities in the field of mobile imaging technologies, in particular collaborations with smartphone manufacturers to integrate Leica camera technology. Leica’s entry into the mobile sector began in 2015 with a collaboration with the Chinese technology group Huawei. This strategic partnership led to the development of dual camera systems, starting with the Huawei P9, which was developed with Leica’s involvement. The cooperation was extended to several flagship models and included not only hardware development but also the coordination of image processing. The partnership ended with the Huawei P50 series in 2021.

In early 2020, Leica Camera AG and Insta360 announced a strategic partnership for the launch of the Insta360 ONE R, an adaptive action camera that enables 360-degree recording with an interchangeable camera module. Since then, ONE R has been recognised as one of TIME magazine's best inventions of 2020.

In 2022, Leica and Xiaomi announced a strategic partnership in the field of mobile imaging. The collaboration involves the joint development of smartphone camera systems and related imaging technologies. Since then, Leica-branded camera systems have been incorporated into several Xiaomi smartphone series, including the 12S, 13, 14, 15 and 17 models.

In 2021, Leica launched the Leitz Phone 1 in Japan. This was followed by the Leitz Phone 2 in 2022 and the third generation, the Leitz Phone 3, in 2024. It features Summilux optics and a quad-camera system.

In 2024, Leica introduced its own iPhone app, Leica LUX, a mobile application for photography and image editing. Among other things, the app simulates lenses such as the Summilux-M 28 mm f/1.4 ASPH. or the Noctilux-M 50 mm f/1.2 ASPH. and offers a manually controllable pro mode. Subsequent updates introduced additional image styles developed with photographers, as well as editing options such as adjustable film grain. In 2025, the LUX Grip, a photo grip for manual control of the app, was launched on the market.

In February 2026, Leica released the Leica Leitzphone to the international market in partnership with Xiaomi. The device is based on the Xiaomi 17 Ultra and is manufactured by Xiaomi, while Leica provides the design and software elements. It has a triple-camera system with computational image processing. A mechanical control ring is integrated into the camera module, which can be used for adjusting parameters.

Together with Xiaomi, Leica develops camera modules and image processing algorithms for Xiaomi smartphones.

=== Eyecare ===
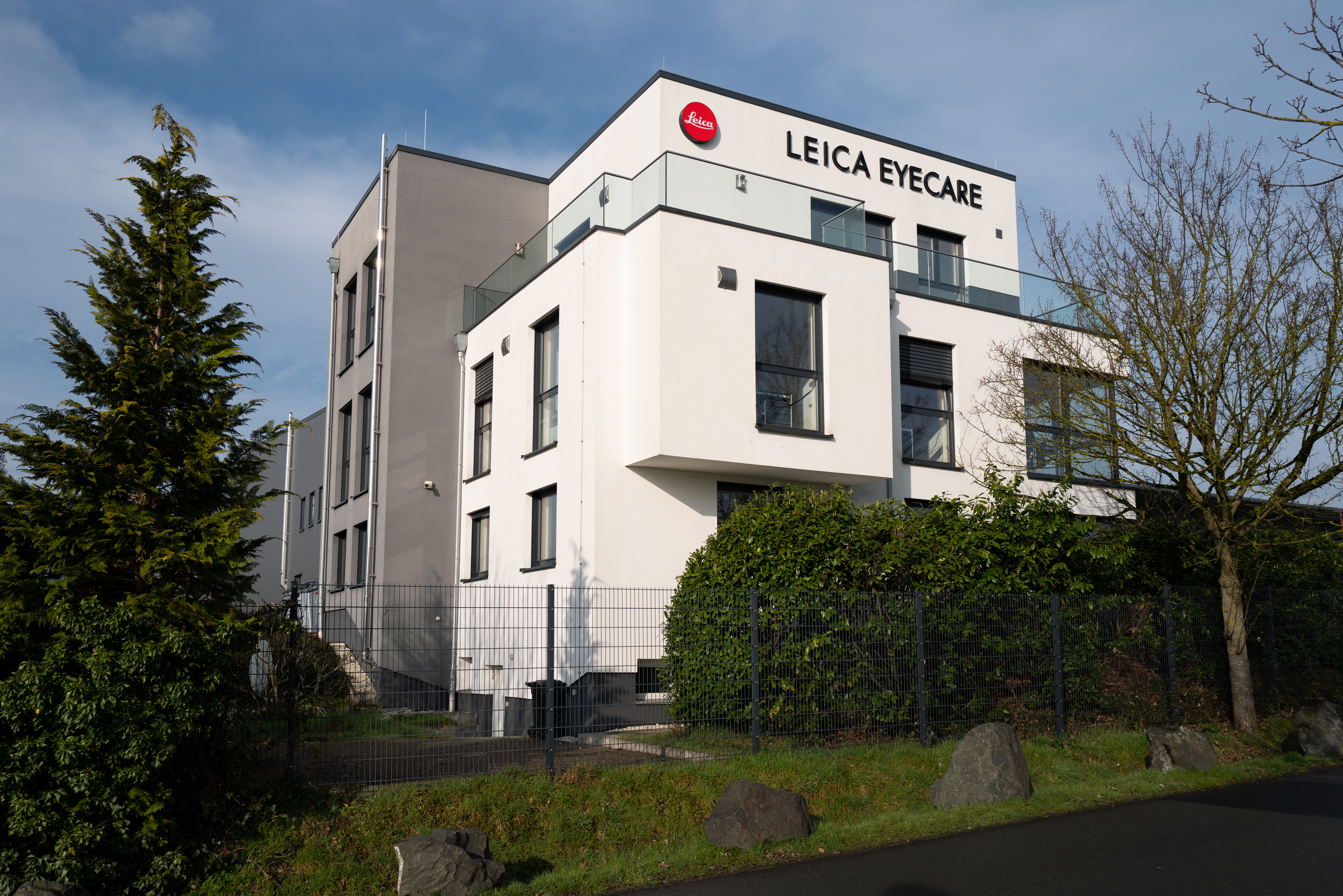
Leica Eyecare headquarters in Heuchelheim

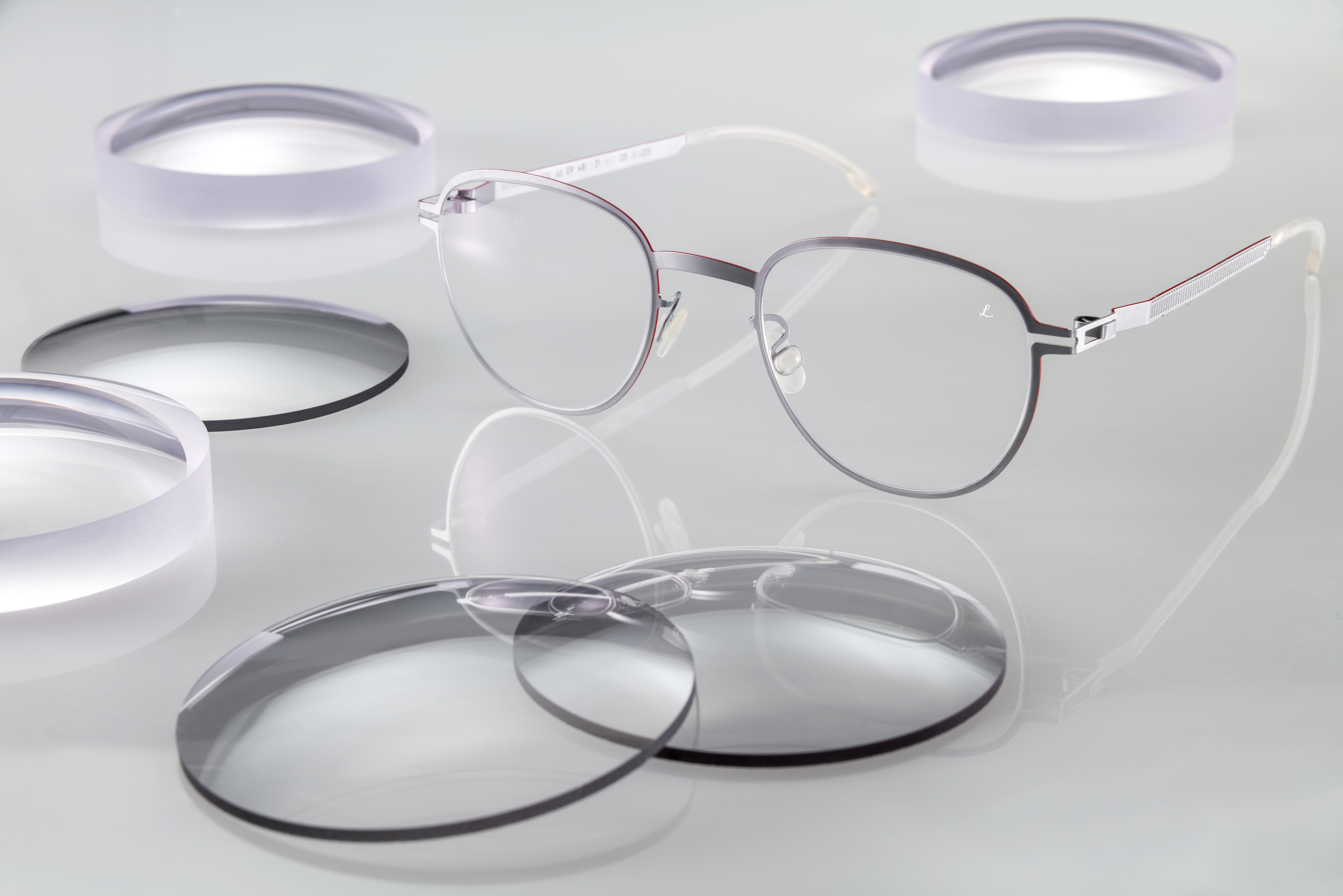
Leica Eyecare product

The spectacle lens business is managed by Leica Eyecare, a subsidiary of Leica Camera AG. It develops and produces spectacle lenses in Germany. In 2023, the company opened a production facility in Heuchelheim. The company develops and manufactures various types of spectacle lenses, including progressive lenses, single-vision lenses and digital lenses, as well as specialised lens designs for photographers.

=== Watches ===
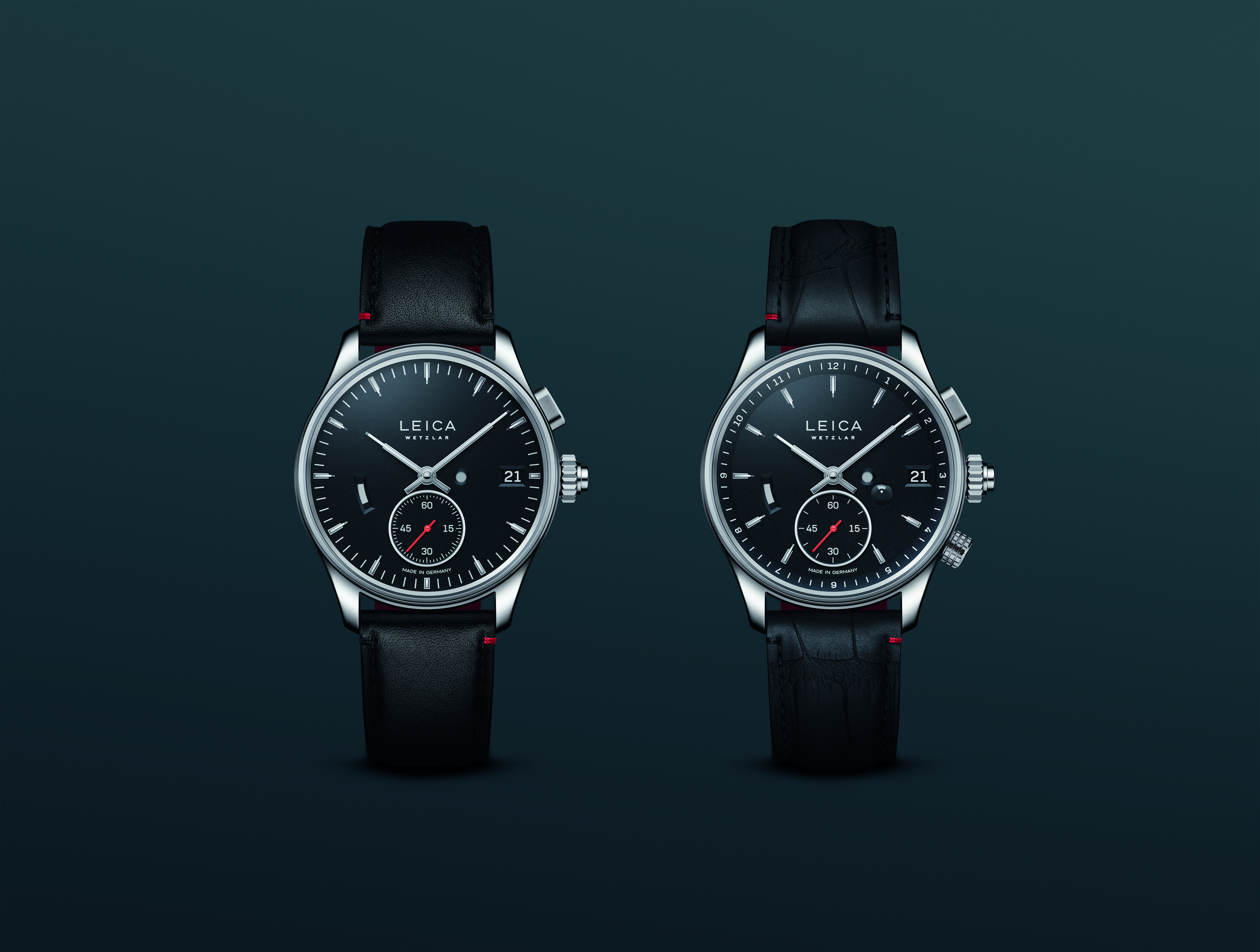
Leica Watches ZM1 and ZM2

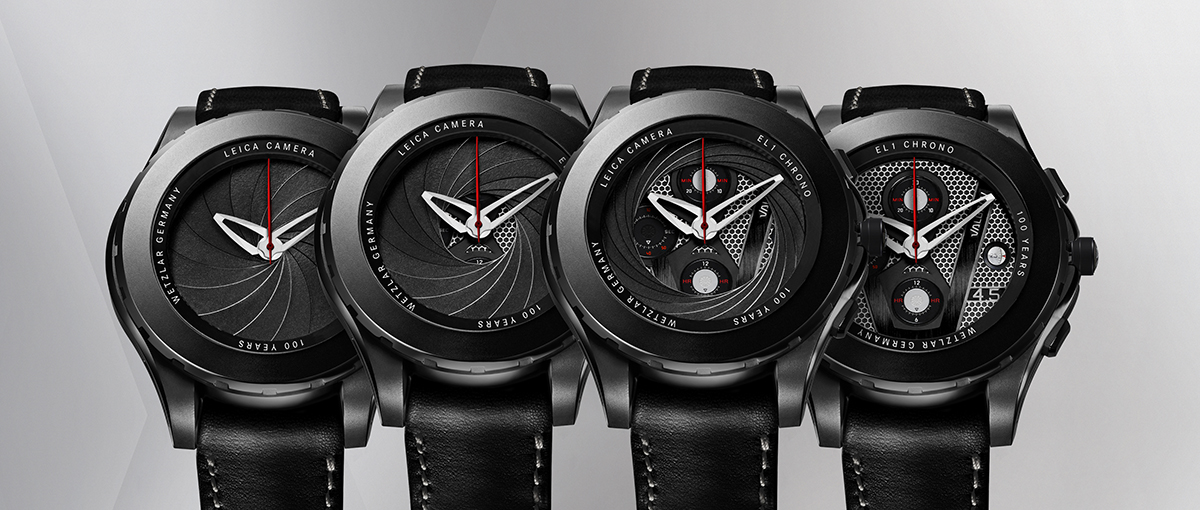
Valbray EL1 limited edition in black for 100th anniversary of Leica camera panorama

Leica Watch is a business division of Leica Camera AG, operating under the name Ernst Leitz Werkstätten GmbH, a subsidiary responsible for watches and other accessories.

The Leica ZM watch line, named after the German term Zeitmesser (meaning "timepiece"), was first introduced in 2018 with the presentation of the L1 and L2 models, later renamed ZM 1 and ZM 2, and was commercially launched in February 2022. Both models feature a hand-wound movement and a patented push-button crown. The line was developed in partnership with Lehmann Präzision GmbH in Germany.

In October 2023, Leica introduced the ZM 11 as a further development of the ZM series. The watches use the LA-3001 automatic calibre, developed with the Swiss company Chronode, and are housed in 41 mm cases made of titanium or stainless steel.

In February 2025, the ZM 12 was introduced as a more compact variant of the ZM 11, with a 39 mm case diameter.

=== Home cinema ===
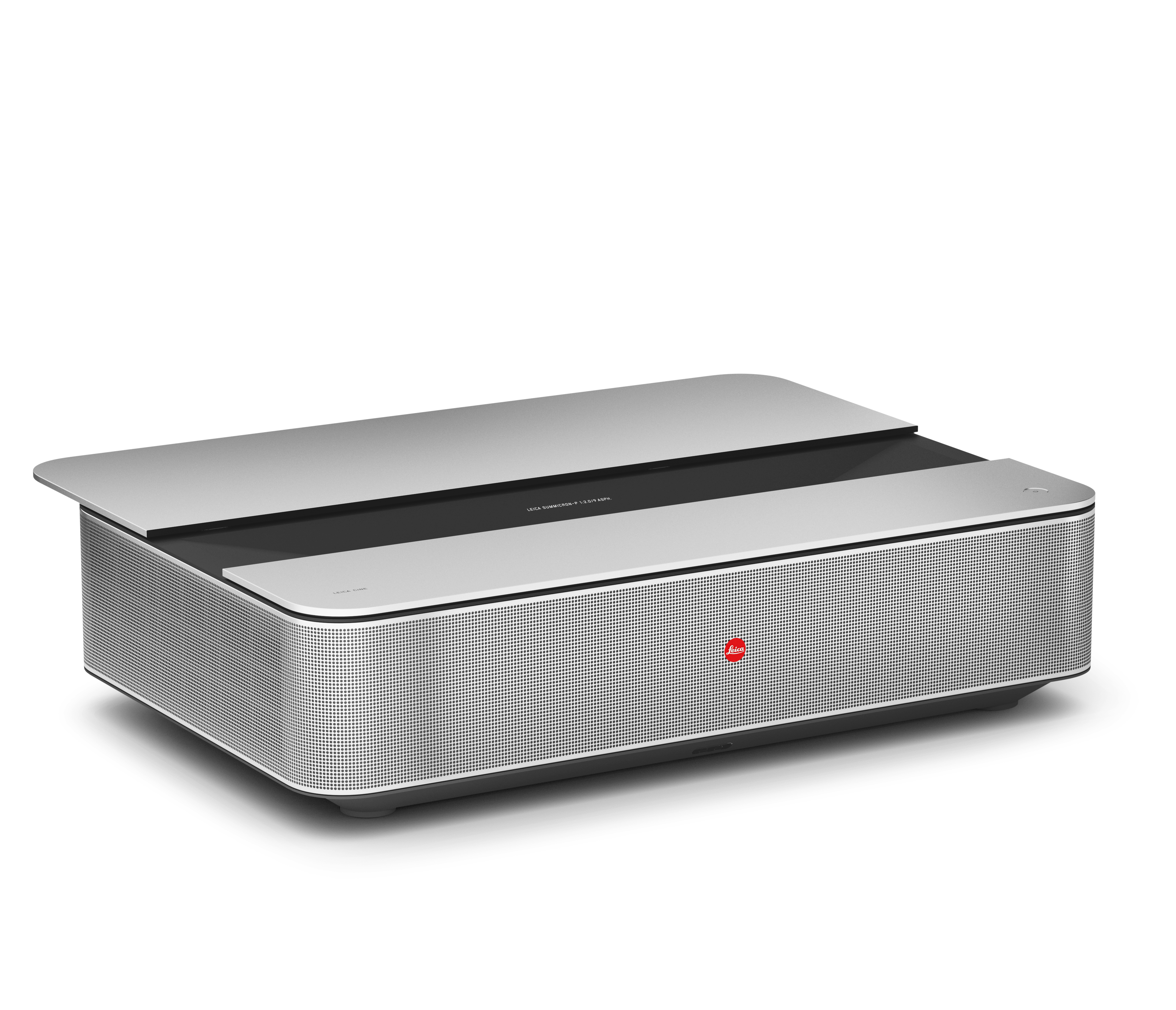
Leica Cine 1

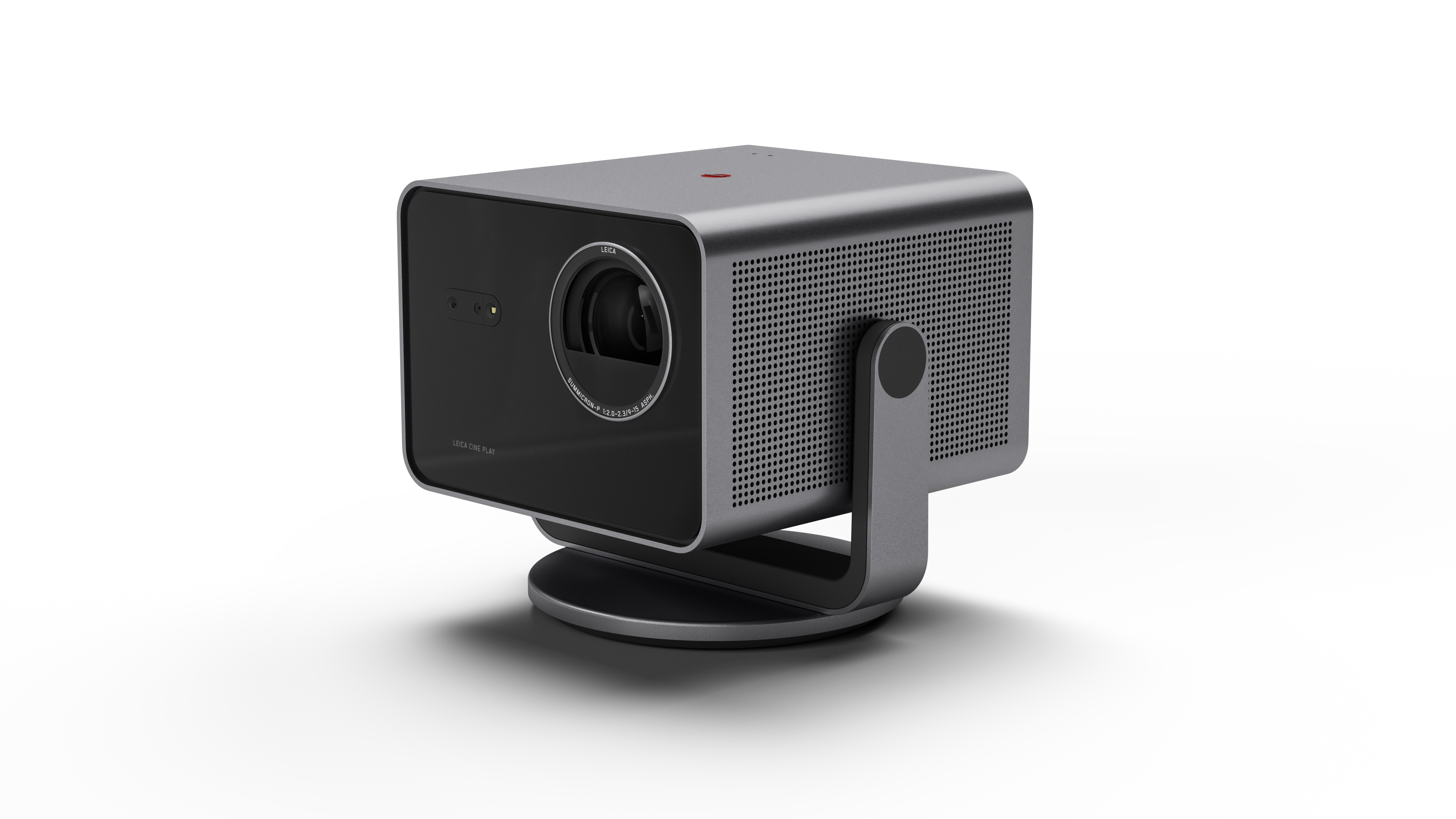
Leica Cine Play 1

Leica is active in the home cinema segment through its smart projection business division and develops projector systems for home theater applications, including portable and short-throw models, based on optical technologies derived from camera manufacturing. An example of this is the ultra-short-throw projector Leica Cine 1, which was first presented in 2022 at the IFA and emerged from a cooperation with Hisense.

In late 2024, Leica introduced the Cine Play 1, a portable triple-laser 4K projector with a brightness of 3,000 lumens.

The Leica Cine Compact 1 was unveiled on 18 June 2026 and is a compact 4k laser projector designed for home cinema use.

== Research and development ==
The company develops its digital infrastructure to support the integration of legacy camera systems with digital technologies. This includes the use of computational imaging techniques, such as algorithms for noise reduction and dynamic range processing. Leica also develops digital services and software applications intended to support interoperability with existing and future products. The digital infrastructure provides a framework for interaction between hardware, software and networked applications, including functions related to image processing and image management.

== Cooperation ==
During the 2018 Photokina in Cologne, Leica announced that Sigma and Panasonic had become licensed for the L-mount platform. The three companies would form a strategic and technical alliance, yet remain independent. Through the L-Mount Alliance, Leica Camera AG, Sigma, Panasonic, Ernst Leitz Wetzlar GmbH, DJI, Astrodesign, Samyang Optics, Blackmagic Design and Sirui, Viltrox and Freefly formed a partnership to adopt a common lens mount standard.

As part of their partnership, Mykita, a Berlin-based eyewear manufacturer, and Leica Camera AG launched collections of sunglasses and prescription glasses in spring 2020. The debut collection was awarded the Red Dot Design Award 2020 for best product design.

Leica-branded lenses, such as some Nocticron, Elmarit and Summilux lenses, have been used on many Panasonic (Matsushita) digital cameras (Lumix) and video recorders since 2001. Panasonic/Leica models were the first to incorporate optical image stabilization in their digital cameras. Several Panasonic/Leica lenses have been produced for the Micro Four Thirds mount, including the 12 mm f/1.4 Summilux, 15 mm f/1.7 Summilux and 25 mm f/1.4 Summilux prime lenses, and zooms including a 12–60 mm f/2.8–4 and 100–400 mm f/4–6.3.

Leica and Minolta signed a technical cooperation agreement in June 1972. The collaboration included the use of the Minolta XE chassis as the basis for the Leica R3, together with the Copal-Leitz Square electronic shutter module developed with Copal, and the use of the Minolta XD chassis and electronics for the Leica R4. It also covered several R-system lenses, including the MC/MD 24 mm f/2.8, sold by Leica as the Elmarit-R with Minolta glass and German-made casing, the MD Zoom 35–70 mm f/3.5, sold as the Vario-Elmar-R, and the Minolta MD 75–200 mm f/4.5. The cooperation also produced the compact Leitz-Minolta CL and Leica CLE cameras with associated M-Rokkor lenses: the 40 mm f/2, corresponding to the Summicron-C; the 90 mm f/4, corresponding to the Elmar-C and produced first in Germany and later in Japan; and the 28 mm f/2.8, a distinct seven-element, five-group Minolta design that was sold at a lower price than contemporary Leica 28 mm lenses but was reported in tests and later user assessments to offer comparable performance.

== History ==
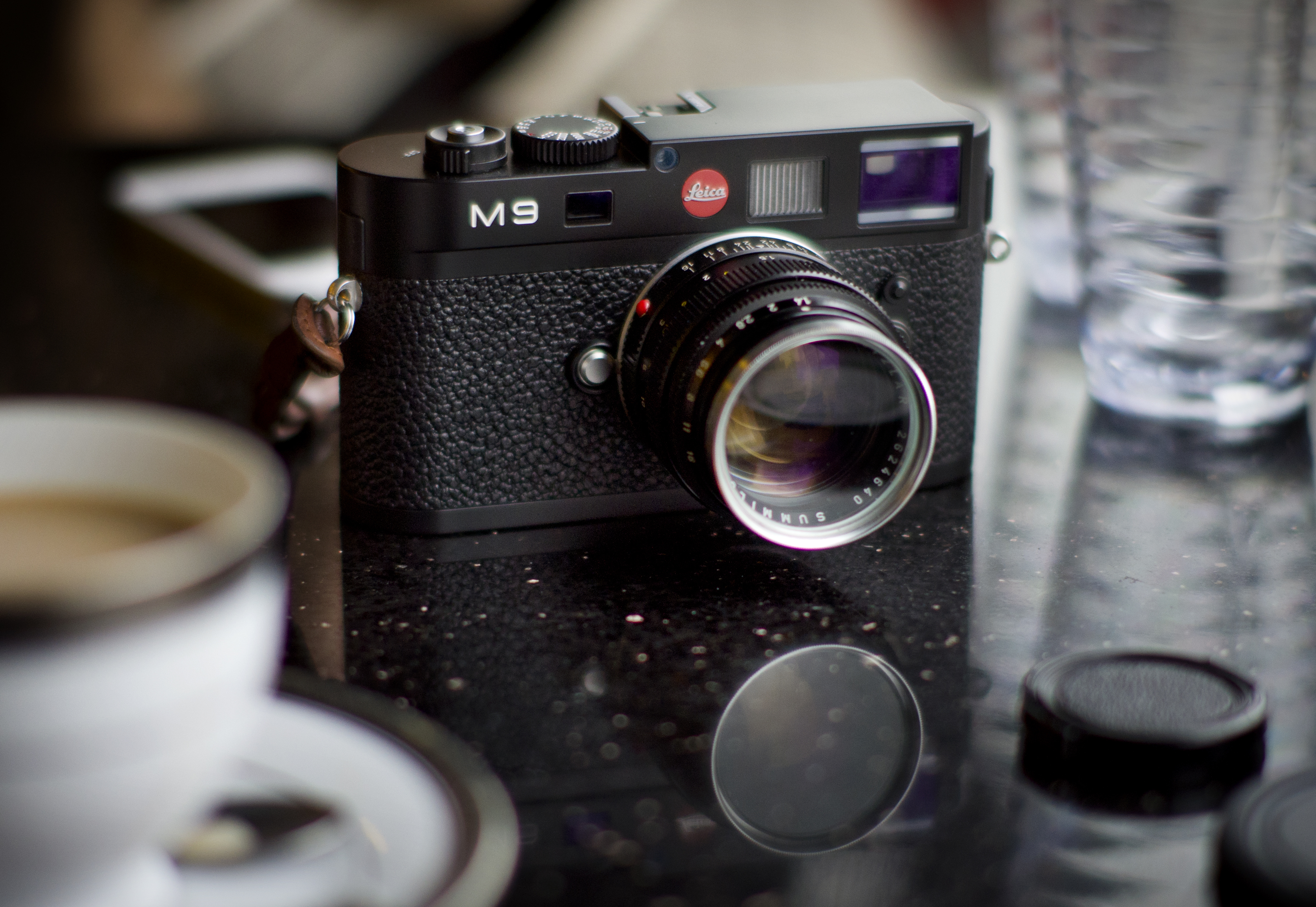
The Leica M9

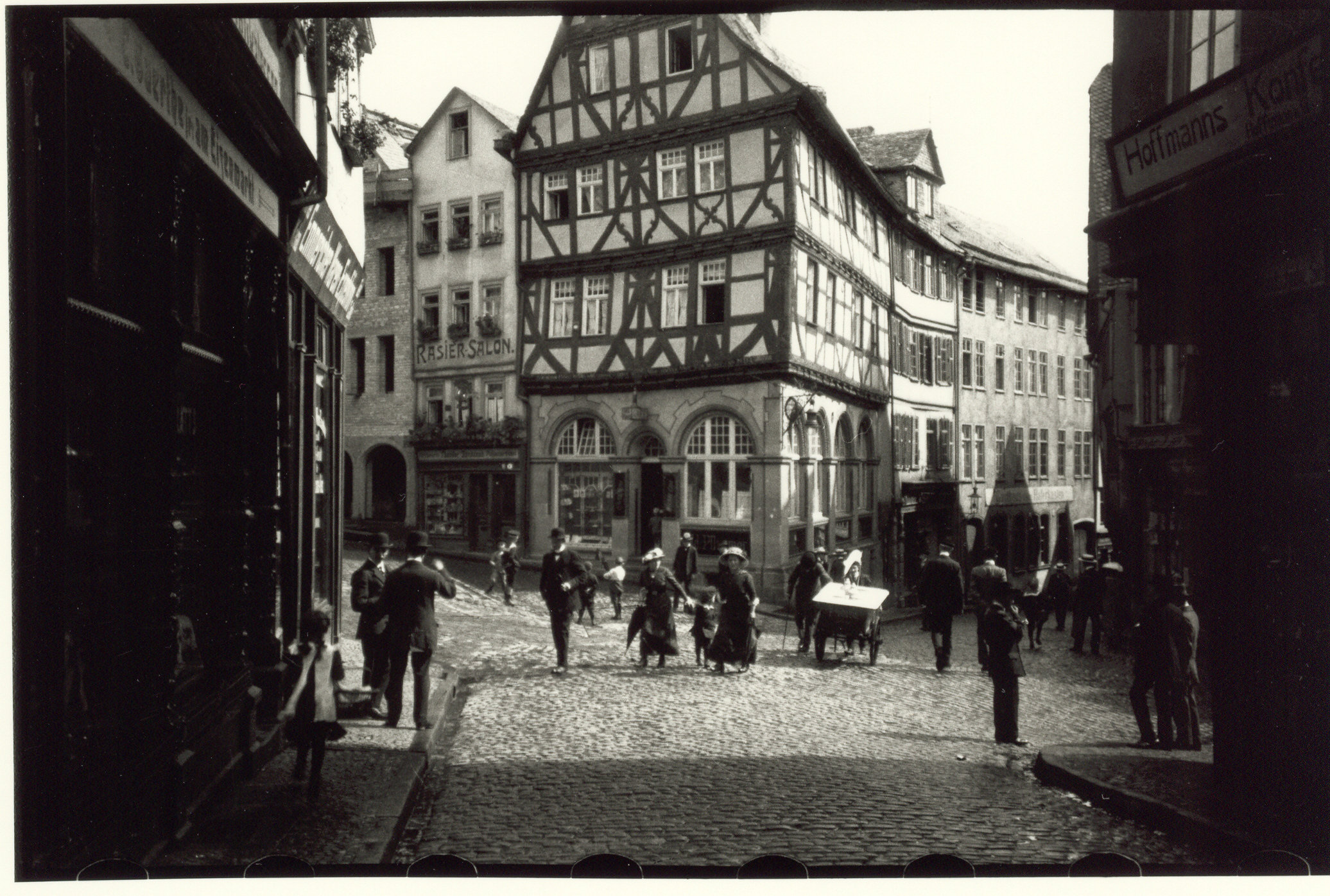
First image taken from the Ur-Leica by Oskar Barnack 1913, Eisenmarkt, Wetzlar, Germany

=== Background and founding ===
In 1849, Carl Kellner founded Optical Institute (Optisches Institut) in Wetzlar, Germany. He produced glasses and telescopes which were popular amongst scientists for their quality and precision. Kellner died at the age of 29 on 13 May 1855 and his wife and apprentice, Friedrich Belthle, assumed responsibility for the company.

In 1864, Ernst Leitz, who studied mechanics, began working at Optical Institute and a year later would become a partner in the company. Belthle died in 1869 and Leitz took over the company. Leitz changed the name of the company to Ernst Leitz-Optische Werke-Wetzlar.

The company was initially involved exclusively in the manufacture of microscopes. In 1907, it began manufacturing binoculars and, in 1910, cinema projectors for film screenings.

=== Establishment of the camera business ===
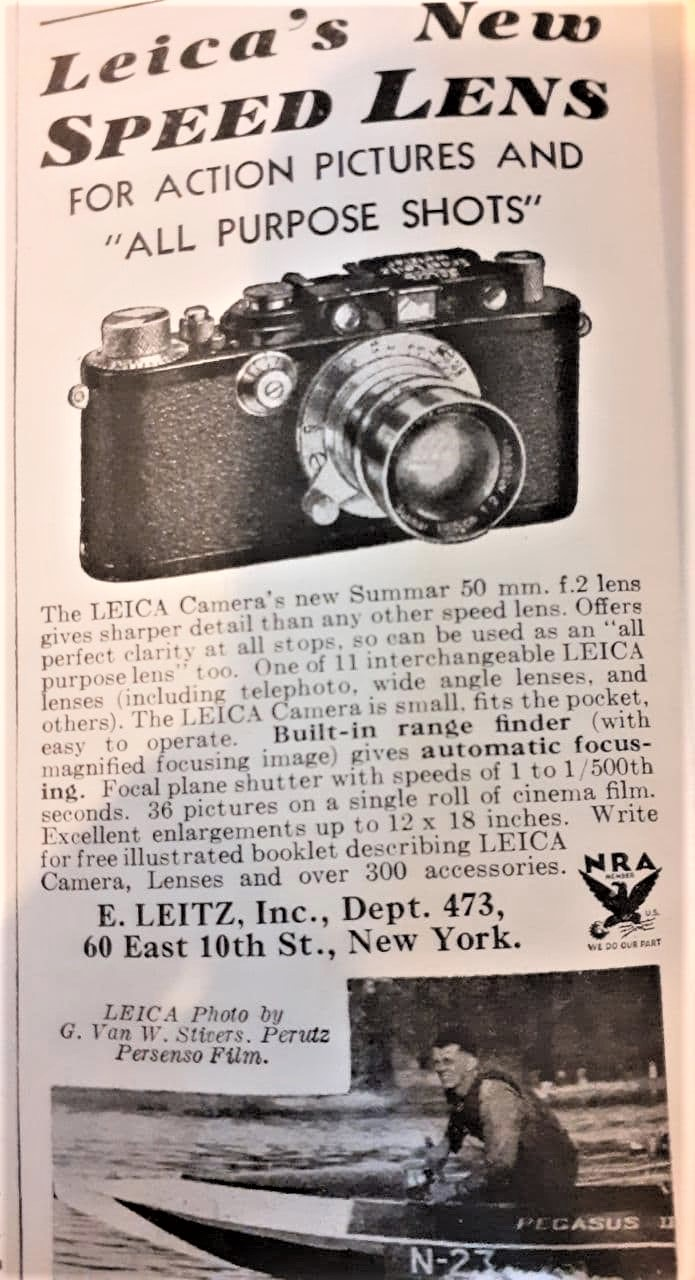
An advert in Time magazine for Leica's new Summar lens, March 5, 1934

Leica I, 1927 (video)

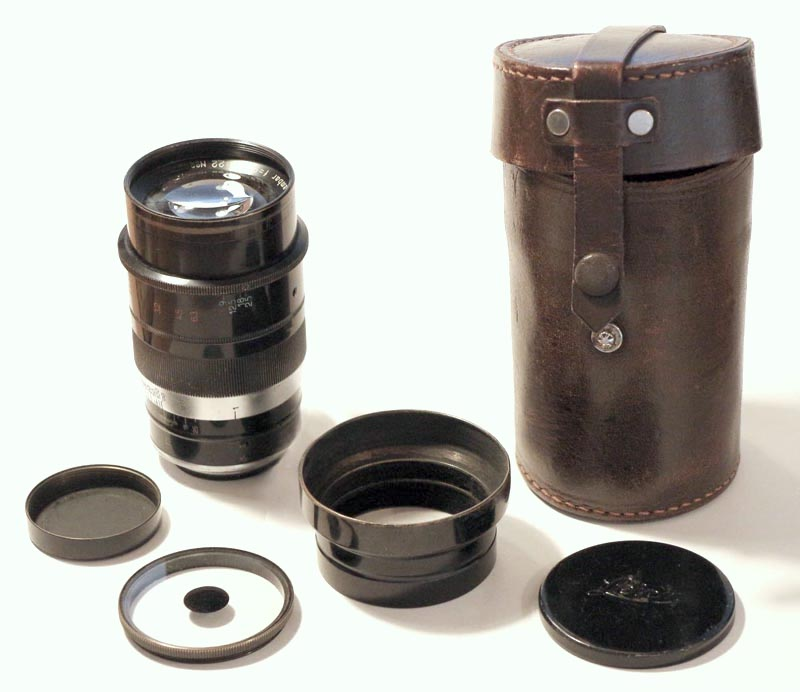
Very rare Leica soft-focus Thambar lens from the 1930s with original leather case. In front, left to right: Rear cap, special dot filter, lens shade, front cap

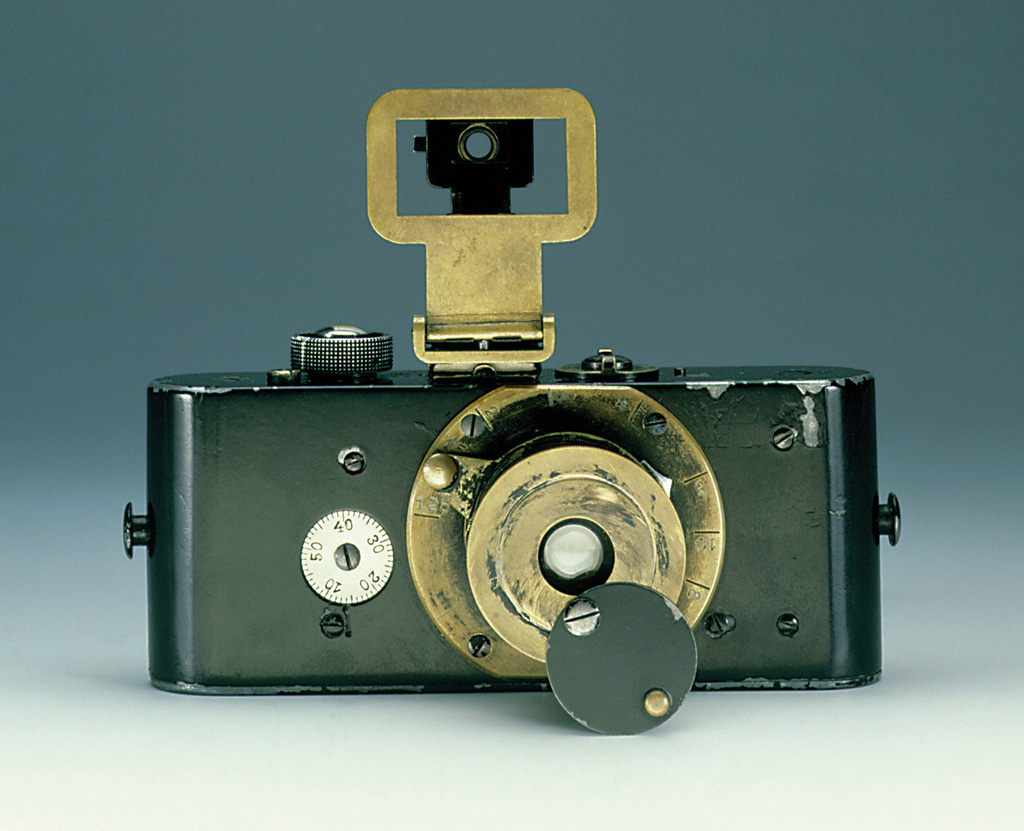
Ur-Leica ("original Leica"), from 1914

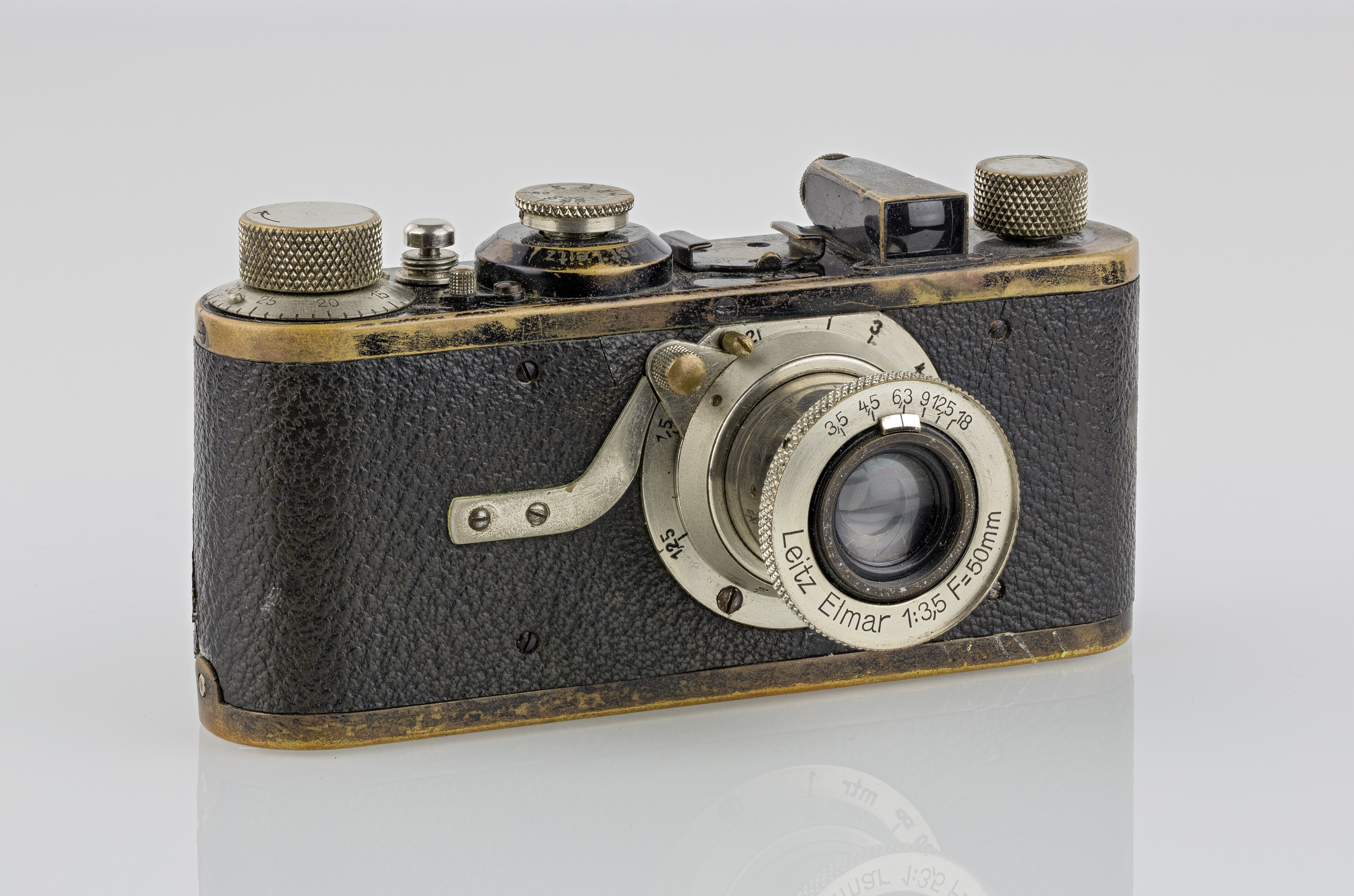
Leica I, 1927

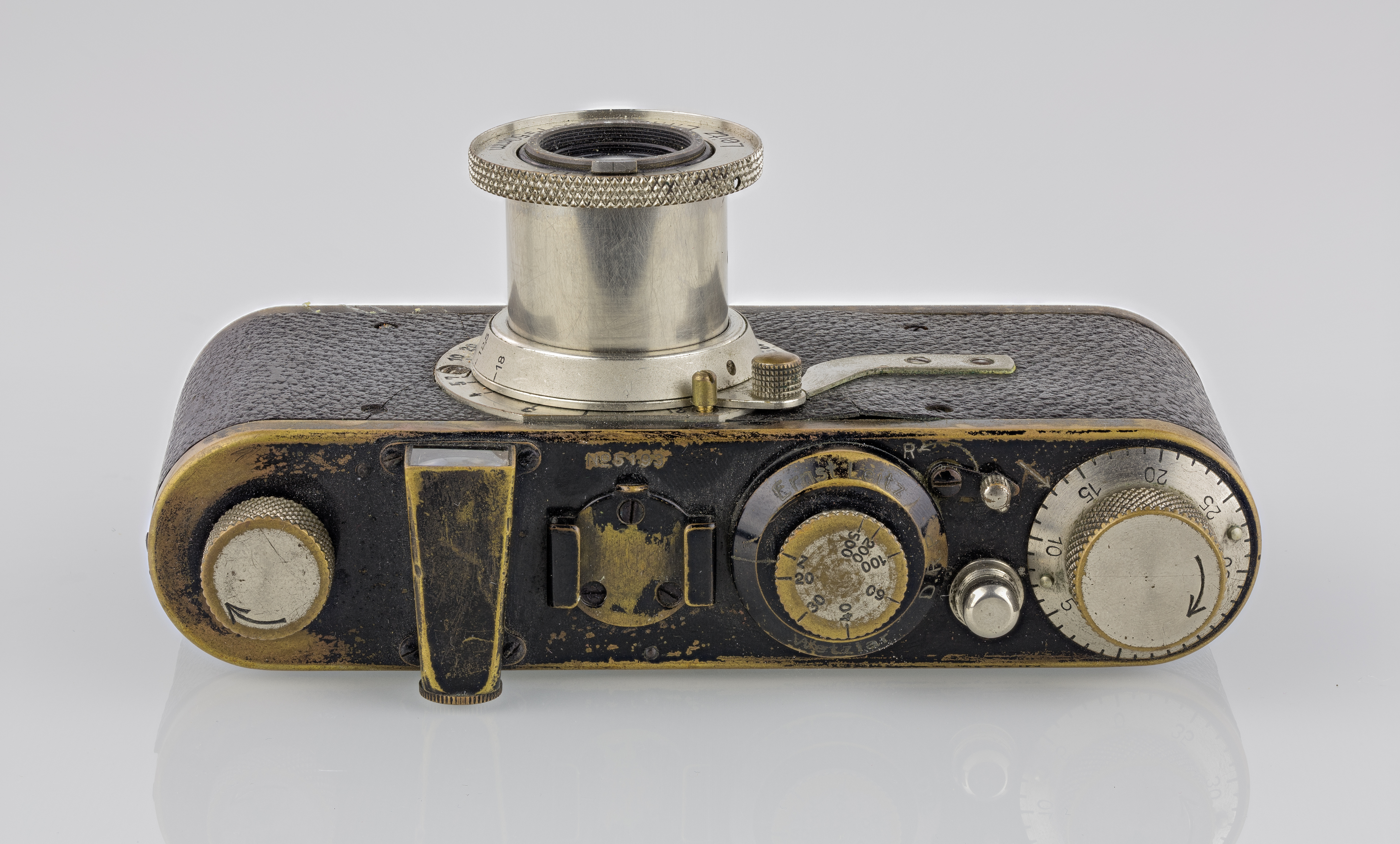
Leica I, from 1927, with collapsible Leitz Elmar 1:3,5 F=5 cm lens

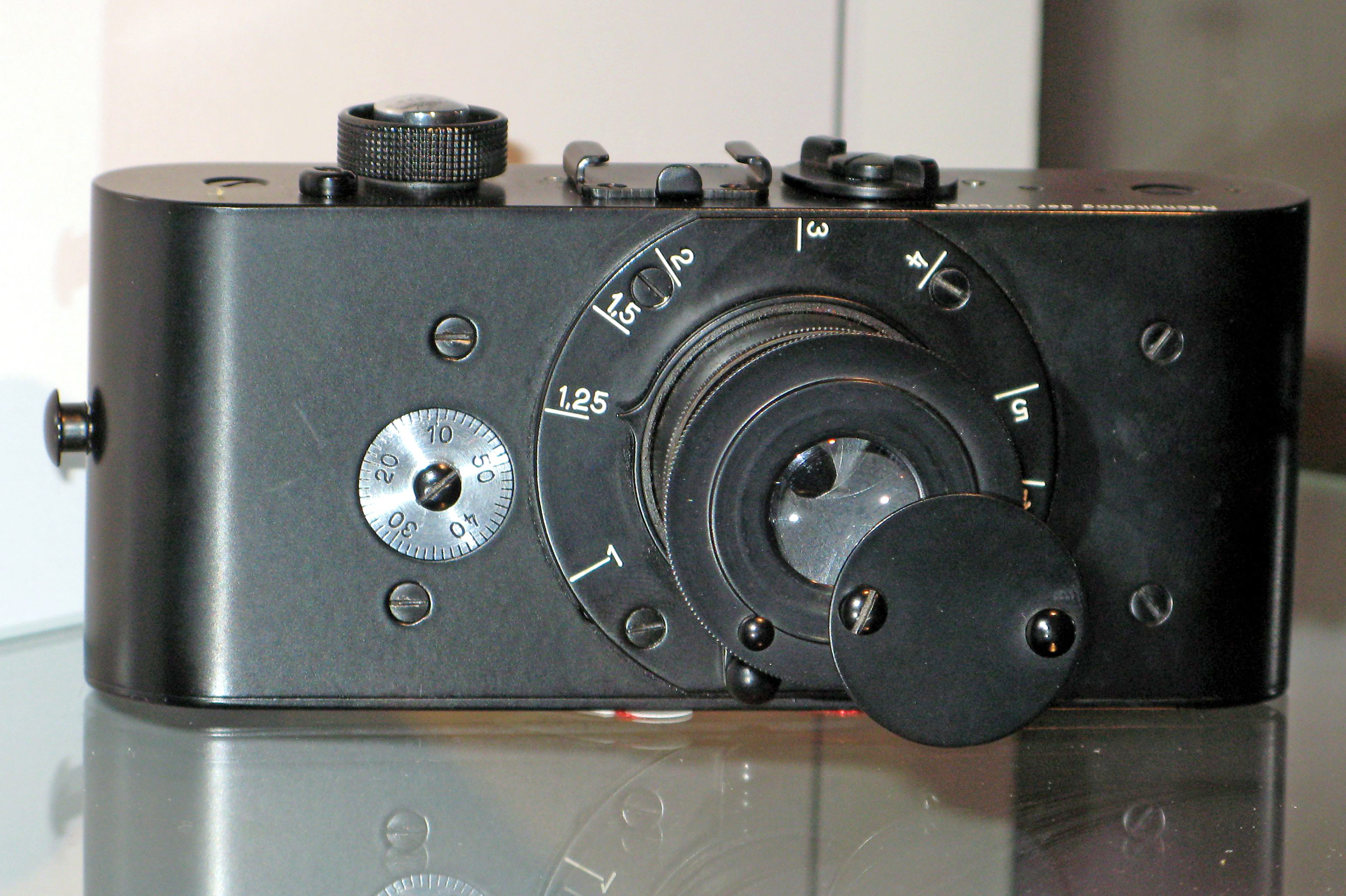
Reproduction of the Leica Prototype, 1913, 1:3,5

In 1914, Oskar Barnack began the development of the Leica cameras. Barnack was head of development at Ernst Leitz Optische Werke in Wetzlar at that time and was also an amateur photographer. Because of his impaired health, he no longer wished to carry the heavy plate cameras then in use. The prototype developed for this purpose in 1914 is known as the Ur-Leica and marked the beginning of Leica’s camera production. The Leica was the first practical 35 mm camera that used standard cinema 35 mm film. The Leica transports the film horizontally, extending the frame size to 24×36mm with a 2:3 aspect ratio, instead of the 18×24 mm of cinema cameras, which transport the film vertically.

In 1920, Ernst Leitz II took over the management of the company and, in 1924, despite difficult economic times, decided to mass-produce Barnack’s 35mm camera. It was an immediate success when introduced at the 1925 Leipzig Spring Fair as the Leica I (for Leitz camera). The focal plane shutter has a range from 1/20 to 1/500 second, in addition to a Z for Zeit (time) position.

Barnack conceived the Leica as a small camera that produced a small negative. To make large photos by enlargement, (the "small negative, large picture" concept) requires that the camera have high quality lenses that could create well-defined negatives. Barnack tried a Zeiss Tessar on his early prototype camera, but because the Tessar was designed for the 18×24 mm cine format, it inadequately covered the Leica's 24×36mm negative. Barnack resorted to a Leitz Mikro-Summar 1:4.5/42 mm lens for the prototype, but to achieve resolution necessary for satisfactory enlargement, the 24x36 mm format needed a lens designed specially for it. The first Leica lens was a 50 mm f/3.5 design based on the Cooke triplet of 1893, adapted by Max Berek at Leitz. The lens has five elements in three groups—the third group being three cemented elements—and was initially named the Leitz Anastigmat. Unlike other triplets, the Leitz Anastigmat has the diaphragm between the first and second elements.

Less than 150 cameras with Anastigmat were sold before the lens was renamed the ELMAX, for E Leitz and Max Berek. By 1925, Professor Berek designed an improved version of the ELMAX named the ELMAR that had four elements in three groups. The third group was simplified to two cemented elements, which was easier and cheaper to make.

By 1925, around 900 cameras had been sold, and more than 1,600 in the following year. From 1927 onwards, the camera business was profitable and sold more than 3,200 cameras. By the end of 1931, more than 68,000 Leica cameras had been sold.

In 1930, the Leica I Schraubgewinde was first produced. It had an exchangeable lens system based on a 39mm diameter screw thread, often referred to as the Leica Thread Mount or LTM. In addition to the 50 mm normal lens, a 35 mm wide angle and a 135 mm telephoto lens were initially available.

The Leica II was first produced in 1932, with a built in rangefinder coupled to the lens focusing mechanism. This model has a separate viewfinder (showing a reduced image) and rangefinder. In 1932, the flange to filmplane was standardised to 28.8mm, first implemented on Leica model C, and the Leica Standard the next year.

The Leica III added slow shutter speeds down to 1 second, and the model IIIa added the 1/1000 second shutter speed. The IIIa is the last model made before Barnack's death, and therefore the last model for which he was wholly responsible. Leitz continued to refine the original design through to 1957. The final version, the IIIg, includes a large viewfinder with several framelines. These models all have a functional combination of circular dials and square windows.

Early Leica cameras bear the initials D.R.P., which stands for Deutsches Reichspatent, the name for German patents before May 1945. This is probably a reference to German patent No. 384071 "Rollfilmkamera" granted to Ernst Leitz, Optische Werke in Wetzlar, on November 3, 1923.

The company had always had progressive labor policies which encouraged the retention of skilled workers, many of whom were Jewish. Ernst Leitz II, who began managing the company in 1920, responded to the election of Hitler in 1933 by helping Jews to leave Germany, by "assigning" hundreds (even if they were not actually employees) to overseas sales offices where they were helped to find jobs. The effort intensified after Kristallnacht in 1938, until the borders were closed in September 1939. The extent of what came to be known as the "Leica Freedom Train" only became public after his death, well after the war.

=== Leica buildings ===
In the last decades of the 19th century, Ernst Leitz moved its production facilities to the slopes of Kalsmunt with sufficient residential buildings and workshops on Laufdorfer Weg. At the turn of the century, the expansion of optical production in Wetzlar led to the construction of several multi-storey factory buildings.

From the year 1907 to the 1950s, the buildings that formed Leica's factory were located on Ernst Leitz Street in Wetzlar. The Wetzlar factory was located opposite of the administrative building and formed a special urban architecture; located upstream of the slope of Kalsmunt, it forms a structural graduation from the skyscrapers to the ruins of Kalsmunt Castle. Early plans by architect Jean Schmidt in 1907 were revised in favour of a simpler concrete-frame structure with a reduced façade design. Additional buildings followed in 1911, continuing similar architectural principles.

In the early 1930s, the space between the existing buildings was filled as production continued to grow. Initial designs by Schmidt proposed a taller structure with more decorative elements, but these plans were revised. The city and the district government finally approved a construction of eight floors with a loggia-like ninth floor, that later was closed. Due to the urban landscape that characterized the size of the building, the planning of the district government was initially rejected because of a simple and unsatisfactory exterior design. In 1936, designs for an eight-storey production building were completed, constructed in reinforced concrete and influenced by contemporary industrial architecture. The building was built in 1938 between the two oldest skyscrapers. In 1950, a skyscraper of similar construction with nine floors was added.

The building remained in use until 1986, when production was moved to the city of Solms. As of today, the buildings are used by Leica Microsystems GmbH.

From 1986 to 1988, the camera division became independent and Leica Camera AG moved from Wetzlar to Solms, where headquarters and camera production were located in a new facility. In 2014, Leica Camera returned to Wetzlar by building the so called Leitz Park. The main building of Leitz Park was designed by Gruber + Kleine-Kranenburg Architekten and uses architectural forms associated with camera lenses, including a curved façade and cylindrical structures at the entrance. Leitz Park was later expanded into a wider campus. In 2018, four additional building were completed, including a hotel, museum, a production building and an office tower. Leica Welt and the Ernst Leitz Museum are located here since.

=== Expansion and development ===
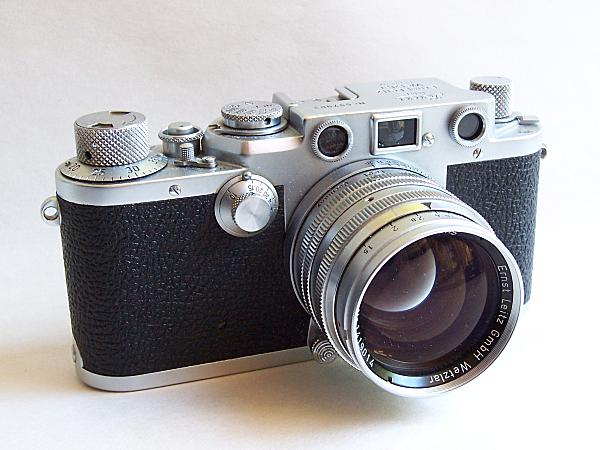
Leica IIIf (1950), one of the last screw-mount Leicas, with 50mm/f1.5 Summarit

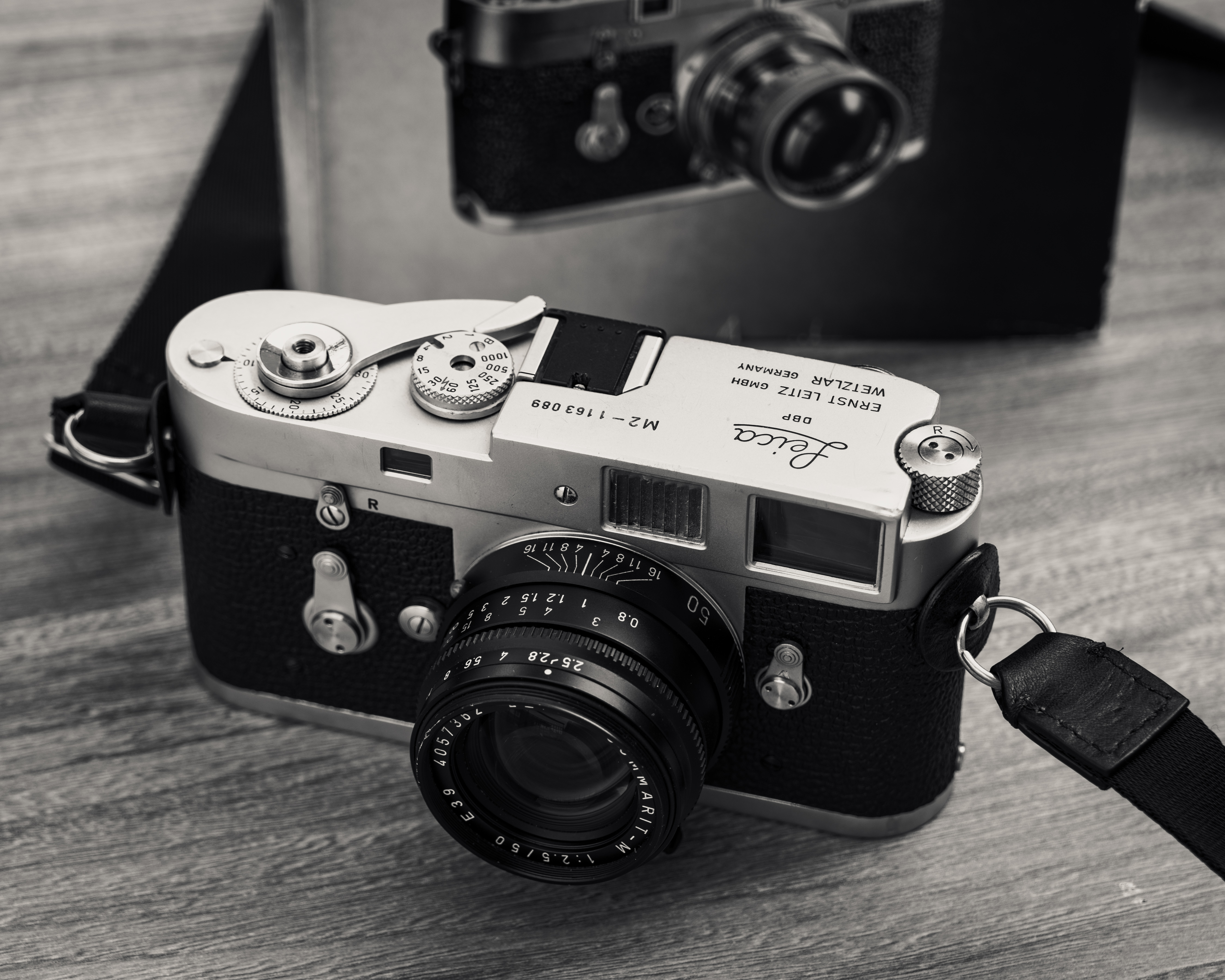
Leica M2, from 1966

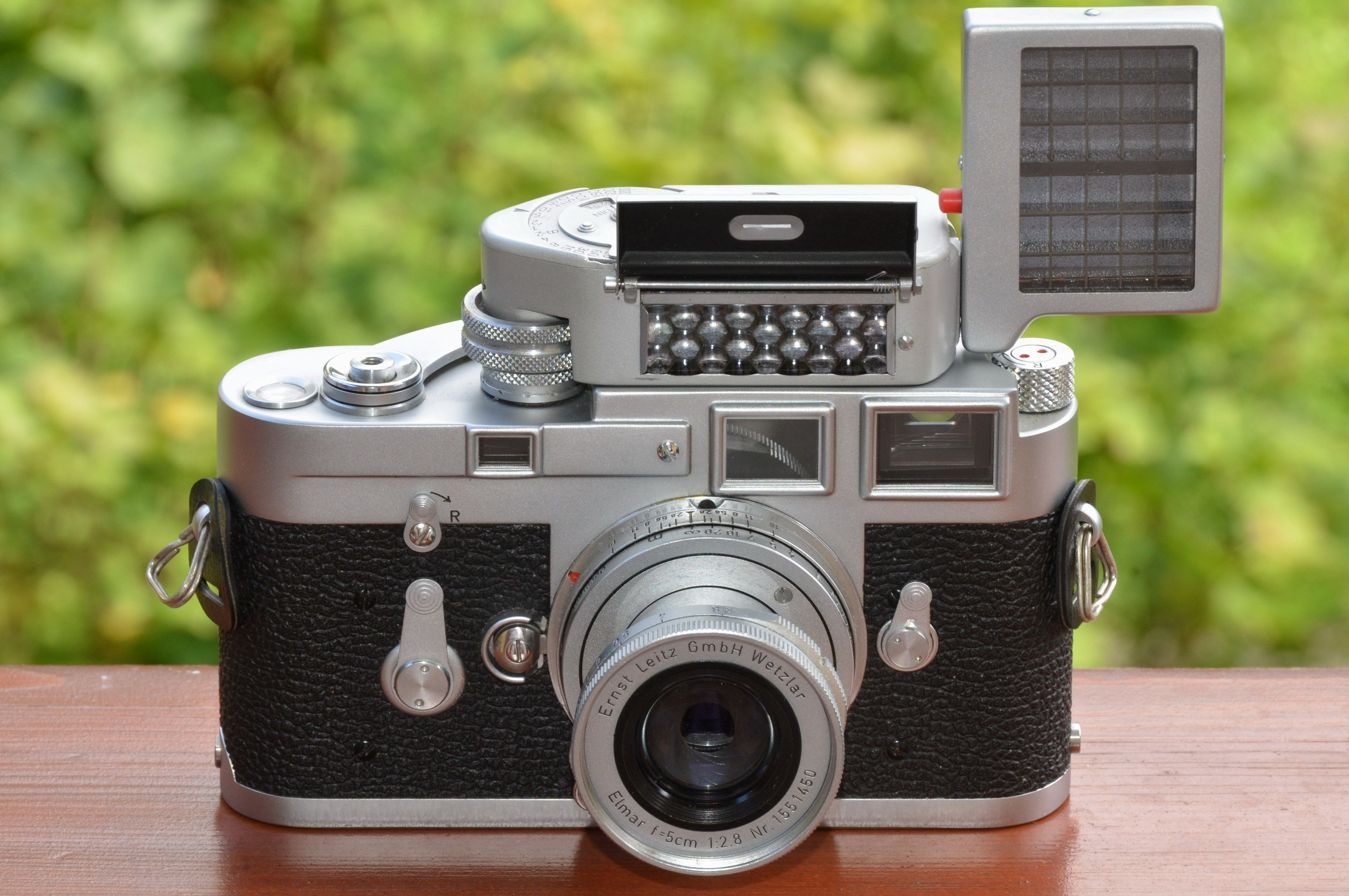
Leica M3 chrome Singlestroke (1958) with Leica-Meter M, Booster and collapsible Elmar f=5cm 1:2,8 M39 lens with adapter

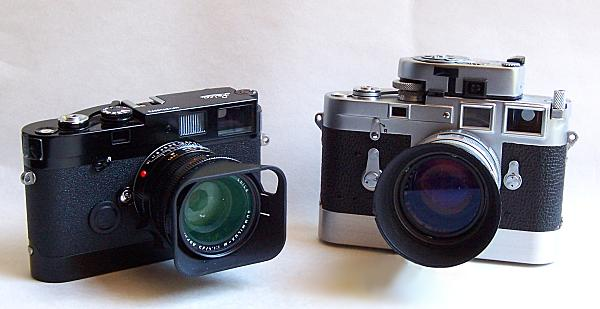
Leica's MP of 2003 and M3 of 1954

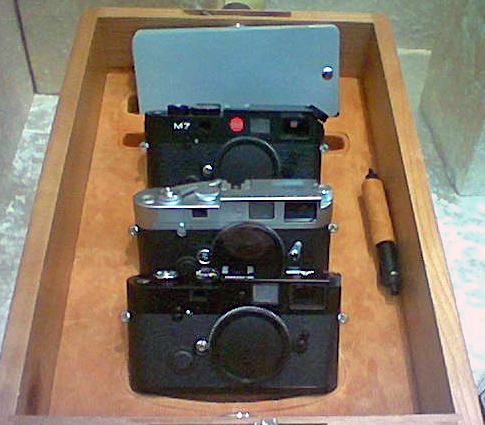
Modern Leica M series

In 1954, the company introduced the Leica M3, featuring the Leica M mount (a bayonet-like lens mount) and a combined rangefinder and viewfinder system. The M series remained in production in updated forms, including later models such as the MP and MA.

In 1952, Günther Leitz decided to establish Ernst Leitz Canada in Midland, Ontario. Until at least the mid-1950s, Leitz offered factory upgrades of earlier Leica cameras to the current model's specifications. The upgraded cameras retained their original serial number.

In addition to cameras, Leica produced slide projectors, including the Prado series, and later collaborated with Kindermann on projector technology and accessories. In 1982, Kindermann and Leitz launched the Leitz-Kindermann magazine for unglazed slides.

Post-war models bear the initials DBP for Deutsches Bundespatent (Federal German Patent), instead of the DRP (Deutsches Reich patent) found on pre-war models. The Leica rangefinder design was widely adopted by other manufacturers, including the Leotax, Nicca and early Canon models in Japan, the Kardon in USA, the Reid in England and the FED and Zorki in the USSR.

The company expanded, and in 1973, opened a site in Portugal (Vila Nova de Famalicão). Initially, 100 employees worked there in rented premises; following the completion of the factory at the end of 1975, this number increased to 175. In 1976, Leica also opened its first gallery in Wetzlar.

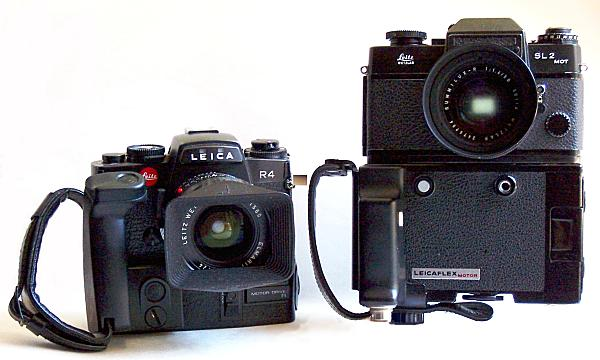
The Leica R4 (1980) and Leica SL2 MOT (1974)

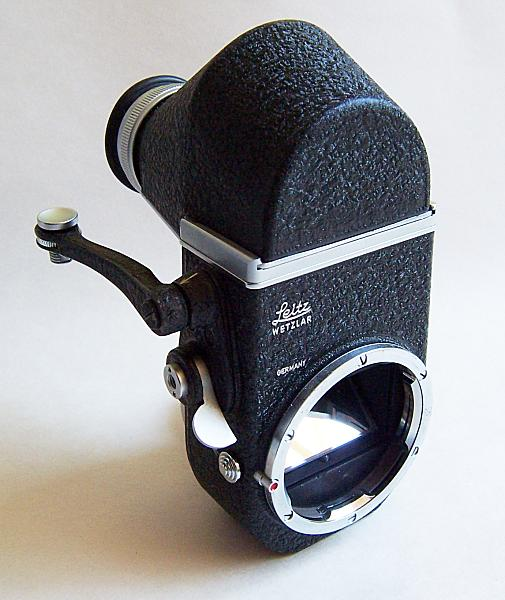
The Leica Visoflex II (1960)

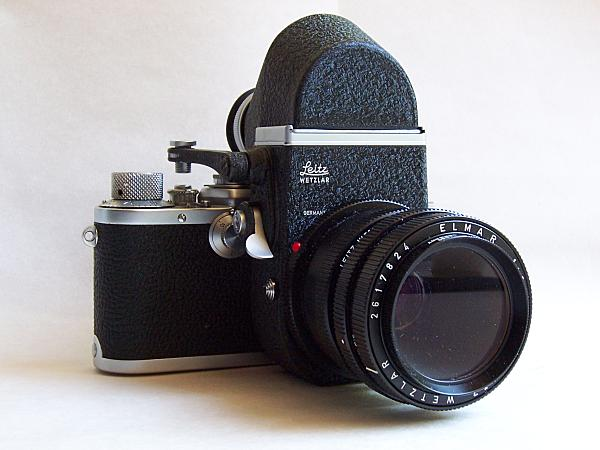
Leica's answer to the SLR: a Leica Visoflex II on Leica IIIf

From 1964, Leica produced a series of single-lens reflex cameras, beginning with the Leicaflex, followed by the Leicaflex SL, the Leicaflex SL2, and then the R series from R3 to R7 in collaboration with the Minolta. The R system remained in production until 2009, when it was discontinued.

Leica Visoflex System system formed an intermediate solution between rangefinder and single-lens reflex cameras. It consisted of a mirror reflex housing attached to Leica rangefinder cameras (in both screw-mount and M versions), allowing focusing via a ground-glass screen instead of the rangefinder. This design enabled the use of longer focal-length lenses, which were difficult to focus accurately with rangefinders. Leitz also introduced different optical developments during this period, including improved lens technologies.

The system originated with the PLOOT reflex housing introduced in 1935, and was further developed as the Visoflex I (1951), Visoflex II (1960) and Visoflex III (1964). It supported different long-focus lenses and adapted optics. The Visoflex system remained in use until it was discontinued in 1984.

Leica also offered accessories and adapters, including applications that enabled the use of different lens mounts across camera systems and facilitated specialised applications such as telephoto photography.

=== Restructuring 'Leitz' to 'Leica' ===
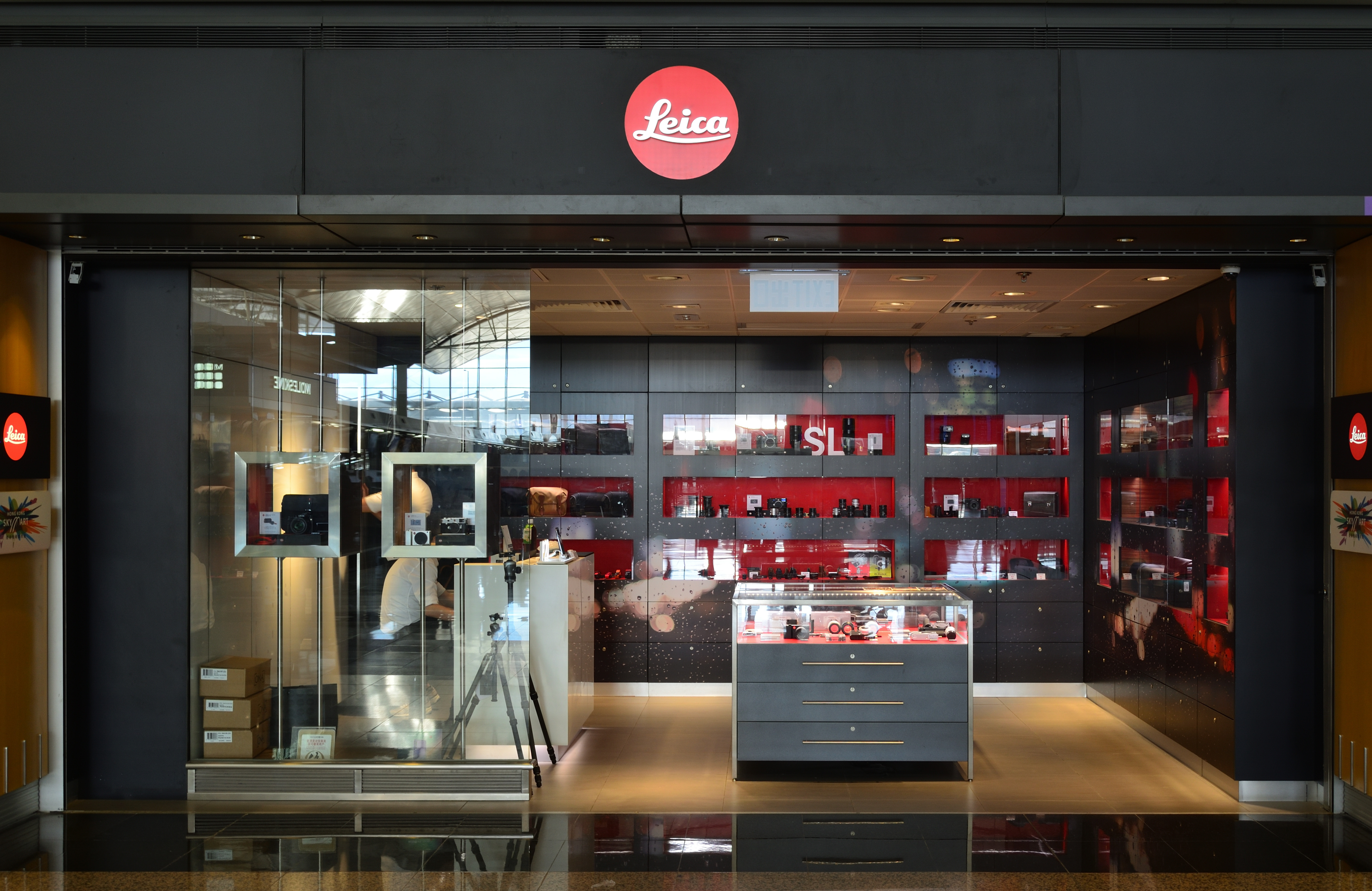
Leica store at Hong Kong International Airport, 2018

In the 1980s, Ernst Leitz Wetzlar GmbH underwent several restructurings. In 1986, the company split its business divisions and founded three new companies: Leica GmbH (cameras and binoculars), Leica Microsystems GmbH (microscopes), and Leica Geosystems AG (surveying technology).

In 1987, Wild Heerbrugg AG (founded in 1921) took over Ernst Leitz Wetzlar GmbH, the parent company of the Leica companies, and formed Wild Leitz Holding AG. In 1990, this merged with The Cambridge Instrument Company plc to create Leica Holding B.V., thereby adding microscopes, surveying and photogrammetry systems, as well as optical scientific instruments. In 1988, Leica GmbH moved from Wetzlar to Solms and was later renamed Leica Camera GmbH.

In 1996, Leica presented the R8 single-lens reflex camera and the digital scanner camera S1. In the same year, Leica Camera GmbH was spun off from Leica Holding B.V. and floated on the stock exchange. In addition, Leica Camera AG acquired Minox GmbH, Wetzlar.

In 1998, as part of a cooperation with Fujifilm, Leica offered its first digital camera, the Digilux. In 2006, the Leica M8 was introduced as the first digital rangefinder camera in the M system. Prior to this, digitisation of the M system had not been possible due to technological limitations, in particular the short flange focal distance. Only with the microlens array developed around 2004 by Kodak were the technical prerequisites created. The Leica M9 with full-frame sensor followed in 2009.

In December 2000, the French luxury goods group Hermès acquired an initial stake of 31.5% through a public takeover offer. Subsequently, Hermès increased its shareholding to over 36% and acquired a majority of a convertible bond issued in 2004. After Leica had generated profits in 1999 and 2000, this was no longer the case in 2001. In 2001, Minox became an independent company again through a management buy-out.

The Leica Digilux 1 was launched in early 2002. The design by Achim Heine was intended to continue the tradition of earlier Leicas.

=== Takeover by Andreas Kaufmann ===
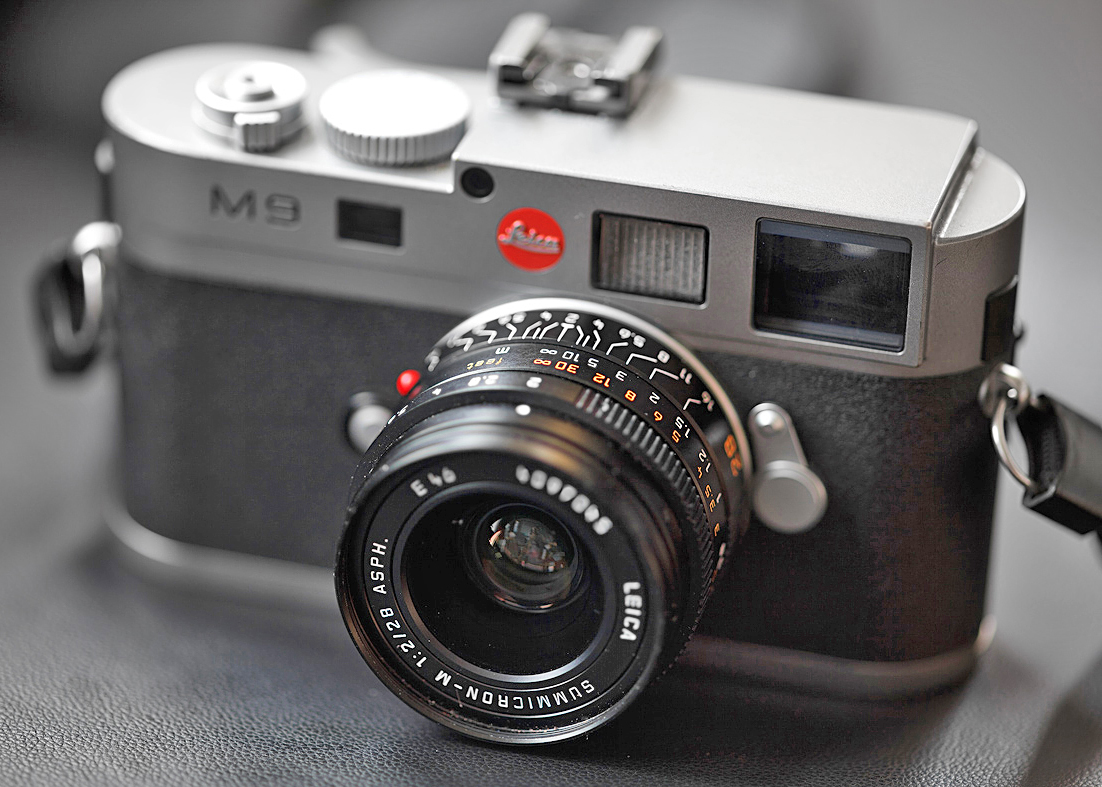
Leica M9

In 2004, the Salzburg-based entrepreneur Andreas Kaufmann entered the company. At that time, the company was struggling with a decline in turnover of 17% and made international headlines in spring 2005 because of its uncertain financial situation. In September 2006, Hermès sold its stake in Leica Camera AG to Kaufmann. By the end of 2007, he had increased his shareholding to around 96.5%, invested a double-digit million Euro amount in the development of new products, and led the company back into profitability by 2010. In October 2011, the US investment firm Blackstone acquired a 44% stake in Leica Camera AG from Andreas Kaufmann. Turnover amounted to €245 million.

In September 2008, Leica introduced a newly developed digital SLR camera system with the S series. The series featured a robust magnesium body and was sealed against splash water and dust.

On 1 October 2012, Leica Camera AG was delisted from the Frankfurt Stock Exchange after Lisa Germany Holding GmbH acquired the remaining minority shares stock resulting in the company being owned privately. A majority stake remains with Kaufmann, who continues to chair the supervisory board.

In March 2013, the expanded factory in Portugal was opened; sports optics products and compact binoculars are manufactured there, as well as parts and assemblies for Leica lenses and system cameras. On 26 November 2013, Leica Camera AG announced the purchase of Sinar Photography AG, Zurich, a Swiss manufacturer of view cameras.

Also in 2013, the British designer Jonathan Ive, long-time chief designer at Apple, together with Marc Newson, designed a Leica camera that was auctioned for charitable purposes. The one-off camera achieved proceeds of USD 1.8 million at auction.

In 2014, the new L mount was introduced, and in May 2014, Leica Camera AG finished building a new factory at Leitz Park 1 in the new industrial part of Wetzlar and relocated back to the city where it started. The same year, to commemorate Leica camera's 100th anniversary, they partnered with Swiss watch manufacture Valbray to develop a limited edition chronograph wristwatch with Valbray's signature Leica aperture inspired dial.

In 2015, the mirrorless full-frame systems Leica Q and Leica SL were presented in the Leitz-Park. The same year, Leica introduced the special edition Leica M-P Correspondent by Lenny Kravitz. The edition consisted of a Leica M-P (Type 240) and the two lenses Summicron-M 35 mm f/2 ASPH and Summilux-M 50 mm f/1.4 ASPH. Production was limited to 125 sets.

In the following years, under the leadership of Andreas Kaufmann, Leica further expanded its business areas. In 2017, Leica became active in the spectacle lens market and founded the brand Leica Eyecare. Initially, spectacle lenses were manufactured in France in cooperation with the company Novacel. In 2021, the independent Leica Eyecare GmbH was founded, and in 2023 an in-house spectacle lens production facility was established in Germany. In 2018, Leica also entered the watch segment with the L1 and L2 models.

After Leica had established stores with galleries in several cities worldwide, for example in Tokyo (since 2006) and Vienna (since 2012), a store with a gallery opened in Stuttgart in autumn 2019, followed by a store in Munich featuring a gallery in November 2020.

In April 2019, a television commercial for Leica titled "The Hunt" was released online. The commercial depicts photojournalists in war-torn and politically unstable environments; one of whom takes a photograph of the Tank Man during the 1989 Tiananmen Square protests and massacre. Following censorship of the Leica brand on Sina Weibo, Leica revoked the commercial and sought to distance themselves from it, claiming the company did not sanction its production.

In March 2020, the final camera in the S-series, the Leica S3, was released, featuring a newly developed image sensor with a resolution of 64 megapixels. The sensor had a dynamic range of 15 f-stops and a light sensitivity of up to ISO 50,000. Video recording was possible at resolutions of up to 4096 × 2160 pixels.

=== Developments since 2022 ===
In August 2022, Leica agreed on a technological cooperation with the Chinese company Hisense. In November 2022 the Leitz Phone 2, based on Sharp technology, was released exclusively for the Japanese market. The same year, Leica entered the home cinema segment and presented the laser TV Leica Cine 1 at the IFA.

In September 2022, Leica released the special edition Leica Q2 Dawn by Seal in collaboration with the musician Seal. The model, limited to 500 units, is technically based on the Leica Q2.

In February 2023, Leica introduced the Leica D-Lux 7 007 Edition to mark 60 years of the James Bond film series. The special edition is based on the standard D-Lux 7 and features 007 branding, a textured black covering, a lens cap in the "gun barrel" design and matching leather accessories.

In October 2023, Leica became the world’s first camera manufacturer to introduce a camera model with integrated support for so-called content credentials of the Content Authenticity Initiative (CAI) with the Leica M11-P. This function enables the cryptographic capture and storage of metadata at the time of image capture, including information on authorship, date and place of capture, and any editing steps. The content credentials increase transparency and traceability of digital content and ensure the authenticity of image material.

The same month, Leica released the wristwatch models ZM1 and ZM2, manufactured by Lehmann Präzision GmbH in the Black Forest.

In June 2024, Leica released the Leica LUX app for mobile photography and image editing, followed in February 2025 by the LUX Grip, a smartphone grip with compatible control elements.

On 20 April 2026, a partnership with Gpixel to develop digital camera sensors was announced.

== Leica in photographic culture ==
=== Leica Galleries and Academies ===
Leica supports photography worldwide through a range of institutions and programmes. These include around 30 Leica Galleries, which present works by established photographers. In addition, the Leica Academies offer training programmes for photographers at different levels of experience.

=== Leica Welt ===
In Wetzlar, Leica Welt at the company’s headquarters brings together several facilities relating to the history and culture of photography. It includes the Ernst Leitz Museum, which presents the development of the Leica camera and its influence on photography through historical exhibits, technical developments and photographic works produced with Leica cameras.

Leica Welt also includes retail and event facilities, a gallery for photographic art, seminar rooms, and spaces used for auctions of rare cameras and photographs. Its programme includes photography courses and photographic trips.

=== Photography competitions and awards ===
Leica Camera awards the Leica Oskar Barnack Award (LOBA) for documentary photography. The award is named after Oskar Barnack, the developer of the Leica 35 mm camera, and includes both a main prize and an award for emerging photographers. Since 2025, the Leica Women Foto Project Award has been integrated into the LOBA as an additional category. In 2026, Leica introduced the LOBA Women Grant, a grant for professional female photographers aged 21 or over. It is open to applicants worldwide and is presented as part of the Leica Oskar Barnack Award exhibition. In addition, Leica has been awarding the Leica Hall of Fame Award since 2011, honouring photographers for their lifetime achievements and their contribution to the history of photography.

Leica awards the Leica Picture of the Year annually, recognising a historically or artistically significant photograph. In 2025, the distinction was given to an image taken in 1963 by Joel Meyerowitz during the Puerto Rican Day Parade in Manhattan. The photograph was presented in a retrospective at the Ernst Leitz Museum and issued as a limited edition print through Leica Galleries.

=== 100 years of Leica I (2025) ===
In 2025, Leica Camera AG marked the 100th anniversary of the first mass-produced 35 mm camera with international events and exhibitions held in several cities. In addition, an anniversary publication and special camera editions were released. The series of events took place in cities like Dubai, Milan, New York, Shanghai and Tokyo, as well as celebrations at Leitz Park in Wetzlar. The anniversary programme included a Leitz Photographica Auction in June 2025, where a Leica 0-Series camera was sold for €6 million, or €7.2 million including buyer’s premium. Among those attending the event was the actor Jason Momoa, a known Leica collector. The Ernst Leitz Museum in Wetzlar also took part in the anniversary celebrations with two exhibitions. The Magic of the Street (Die Magie der Straße) (February to June 2025) was featured works from the Leica collection, including photographs by Henri Cartier-Bresson and Martine Franck. Since June 2025, the museum has shown a retrospective of Joel Meyerowitz’s work.

== Notable adherents and photographers ==
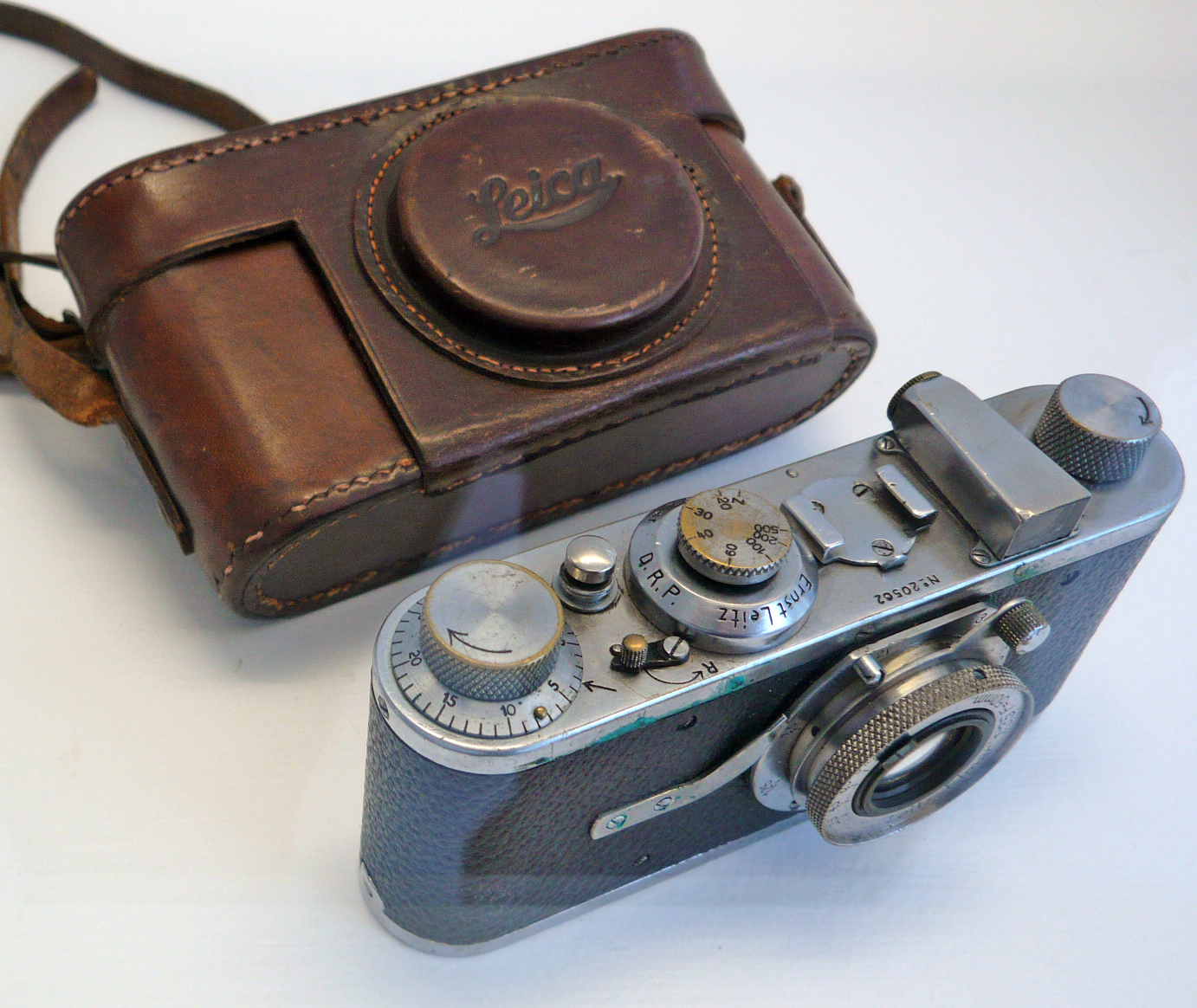
Henri Cartier-Bresson's first Leica

Leica cameras are particularly associated with street photography, especially in the latter twentieth century; they were used by photographers such as Henri Cartier-Bresson and Sebastião Salgado.

Leica cameras have also been used by photographers who are known primarily for their work in other creative fields. Film director Stanley Kubrick, musician Patti Smith, and actor Jason Momoa have all been documented as using Leica cameras in their photographic work, which has been published or exhibited independently of their primary careers. The musician Andy Summers, guitarist of The Police, has published photographic books and has named Leica cameras as part of his photographic practice. Film director David Lynch has also worked extensively as a photographer and has used Leica cameras in his photographic projects, which have been exhibited internationally.

Elizabeth II was frequently seen using Leica rangefinder cameras, most notably the Leica M3 and later the Leica M6, often at equestrian events such as the Royal Windsor Horse Show, where she photographed Prince Philip and other participants.

Other actors, musicians and media personalities such as Jennie Kim, Lalisa Manobal, Brooklyn Beckham, Matt Damon, John Mayer, Brad Pitt, Julia Roberts, Bradley Cooper, Christian Bale, Jennifer Connelly, Henry Golding und Scarlett Johansson also used Leica cameras in movies or photoshoots.

== Antique trade and collecting ==
The Leitz Photographica Auction, held twice a year in Wetzlar and Vienna, is an international auction for historic cameras, lenses and photographic equipment, at which rare and significant items have repeatedly achieved high prices.

Historic Leica prototypes or rare cameras and accessories can sell for very high prices. At the WestLicht auction in Vienna on 10 March 2018, a functional Leica prototype from the 1923 pilot series was sold for €2.16 million. This precursor to the Leica I was, at the time, the most expensive camera in photographic history.

In 2022, a prototype Leica camera from the 0-series (no. 105), formerly owned by Oskar Barnack, was sold at the Leitz Photographica Auction in Wetzlar for €14.4 million. The camera is considered one of the earliest 35 mm cameras and is regarded as the most expensive camera ever sold at auction.

In 2025, a copy of the Leica zero series from 1923 with the serial number 112 was auctioned for €7.2 million at the 46th Leitz Photographica Auction. This made it the second most expensive camera in the world. In November 2025, a Leica M-A formerly owned by Pope Francis was sold at the 47th Leitz Photographica Auction in Vienna for €6.5 million. Leica had presented the camera to Francis in 2024. Whether he used it is not known. The camera and its accompanying lens bear the serial number 5000000 and include a white covering, the papal coat of arms and the motto Miserando atque eligendo. The proceeds were donated to charity, in accordance with Francis’s wishes.

Notably, Leica cameras with military markings are highly valued; this started a market for refurbished Soviet copies with fake markings.

== Exhibitions (selection) ==
- Augen Auf! 100 Jahre Leica Fotografie in two parts: Die Klassiker, 4 December 2015 – 21 February 2016, Galerie WestLicht, and Die Zeitgenossen, 11 December 2015 – 13 February 2016, Galerie OstLicht, Vienna; curated by Hans-Michael Koetzle.
- Augen Auf! 100 Jahre Leica Fotografie, with additional exhibits, 9 March 2016 – 5 June 2016, Kunstfoyer of the Bayerische Versicherungskammer, Munich.

=== Leica in film ===
- The Girl with the Leica (Italian: La ragazza con la Leica) is a 2026 Italian-German biographical drama directed by Alina Marazzi. Loosely based on Helena Janeczek’s novel of the same name, the film portrays photographer Gerda Taro and her use of a Leica camera during the Spanish Civil War.
- Leica – A Century of Vision: German Documentary by Reiner Holzemer, 2026

== See also ==
- Wild Heerbrugg
- Heinrich Wild
- Hektor (lens)
- LHSA
- Leica reel
- Valbray

== Literature ==
- Emmermann, Curt (ed.) (1930). Photographieren mit der Leica. Wilhelm Knapp Verlag, Halle an der Saale. Reprint: Lindemanns Fotobuchhandlung (after 1985).
- Vith, Fritz (1930). Leica-Handbuch. Technisch-pädagogischer Verlag, Wetzlar.
- Wolff, Paul (1939). Meine Erfahrungen mit der Leica. Breidenstein, Frankfurt am Main.
- Stöckler, Heinrich (1941). Die LEICA in Beruf und Wissenschaft. Breidenstein-Verlag, Frankfurt am Main.
- Wolff, Paul (1942). Meine Erfahrungen … farbig. Breidenstein, Frankfurt am Main.
- Stenger, Erich (1949). Die Geschichte der Kleinbildkamera bis zur Leica. Optische Werke Ernst Leitz Wetzlar (ed.). Umschau-Verlag, Frankfurt am Main.
- Kisselbach, Theo (1952). Kleines Leica-Buch. Heering-Verlag, Seebruck am Chiemsee.
- Matheson, Andrew (1956). Das ganze Leica-System. Wilhelm Knapp-Verlag, Düsseldorf.
- Scheerer, Theo M. (1960). Leica und Leica-System (2nd ed.). Umschau Verlag, Frankfurt am Main.
- Kisselbach, Theo (1969). Das Leica-Buch. Heering-Verlag, Seebruck am Chiemsee.
- Tompkins, Brian; Rüttinger, F.-W. (ed.) (1984). Leica Cameras, Pocket Book. Wittig Fachbuchverlag, Hückelhoven. ISBN 978-3-88984-000-4. (German edition).
- Laney, Dennis (1984). Leica Cameras, Zubehör. Wittig Fachbuchverlag, Hückelhoven. ISBN 978-3-88984-015-8.
- van Hasbroeck, Paul-Henry (1987). Leica. Das große Leica-Buch. Entstehung und Entwicklung des gesamten Leica-Systems. Callwey, Munich. ISBN 978-3-7667-0864-9.
- Keller, Emil G. (1990). Leica im Spiegel der Erinnerungen. Lindemann, Stuttgart.
- Laney, Dennis (1995). Leica. Das Produkt- und Sammlerbuch (2nd expanded ed.). Augustus-Verlag, Augsburg. ISBN 978-3-8043-5064-9. Reprint: Lindemann, Stuttgart (2001), ISBN 978-3-89506-223-0.
- Lager, James L. (1993–1998). Leica. An Illustrated History. Lager Limited Editions, Closter, NJ. Vol. 1: Cameras. ISBN 978-0-9636973-1-8. Vol. 2: Lenses. ISBN 978-0-9636973-2-5. Vol. 3: Accessories. ISBN 978-0-9636973-3-2.
- Eastland, Jonathan (1995). Leica-M-Handbuch: Das komplette Leica-M-System von gestern bis heute. Verlag Laterna magica Joachim F. Richter, Munich. ISBN 978-3-87467-567-3.
- Rogliatti, Gianni (1995). Leica, von 1925 bis heute (3rd revised and updated ed.). Wittig, Hückelhoven. ISBN 978-3-88984-028-8.
- Rogliatti, Gianni (1995). Objektive für Leica Kameras von 1924 bis heute (2nd revised and updated ed.). Wittig, Hückelhoven. ISBN 978-3-88984-010-3.
- Sartorius, Ghester (1997). Identifying Leica Cameras. Amphoto Books, New York. ISBN 978-0-8174-4026-8.
- Sartorius, Ghester (1999). Identifying Leica Lenses. Amphoto Books, New York. ISBN 978-0-8174-4027-5.
- Osterloh, Günther (2000). Leica R. Angewandte Leica-Technik (3rd completely revised ed.). Umschau Buchverlag, Frankfurt am Main. ISBN 978-3-8295-7203-3.
- Osterloh, Günther (2002). Leica M. Hohe Schule der Kleinbildfotografie (5th revised ed.). Umschau, Frankfurt am Main. ISBN 978-3-8295-6501-1.
- Albus, Volker (2004). Leica. Positionen der Markenkultur (Views of Brand Culture). Edited by Achim Heine. Nicolaische Verlagsbuchhandlung, Berlin. ISBN 978-3-87584-106-0.
- Osterloh, Günther (2004). 50 Jahre Leica M / 50 Years Leica M. Heel Verlag, Königswinter. ISBN 978-3-89880-353-3.
- Pasi, Alessandro (2004). Die Leica. Zeugin eines Jahrhunderts. Heel Verlag, Königswinter. ISBN 978-3-89880-258-1.
- Kühn-Leitz, Knut (2006). Ernst Leitz – Wegbereiter der Leica. Heel Verlag, Königswinter. ISBN 978-3-89880-551-3.
- Lüpkes, Sandra (2023). Das Licht im Rücken. Rowohlt, Hamburg. ISBN 978-3-463-00025-1.
- Sparr, Holger (2025). 100 Jahre Leica Camera: Modelle – Historie – Fotokunst. Heel Verlag, Königswinter. ISBN 978-3-69019-045-9.

Type		2006	2007	2008	2009	2010	2011	2012	2013	2014	2015	2016	2017	2018	2019	2020	2021	2022
Leica	M		M8			M9/ M9-P			M (240)/ M-P (240)				M10/ M10-P					M11
Leica	ME								M-E (220)			M (262)				M-E (240)		
Leica	MM								MM			MM (246)				M10M		
Leica	MD												M-D (262)		M10-D			
Leica	MR																M10-R	
Non-Leica		Epson R-D1 • Zenit M																

Type	1950s										1960s										1970s										1980s										1990s										2000s										2010s										2020s									
Type	50	51	52	53	54	55	56	57	58	59	60	61	62	63	64	65	66	67	68	69	70	71	72	73	74	75	76	77	78	79	80	81	82	83	84	85	86	87	88	89	90	91	92	93	94	95	96	97	98	99	00	01	02	03	04	05	06	07	08	09	10	11	12	13	14	15	16	17	18	19	20	21	22	23	24	25	26	27	28	29
Leica					M3																																																																											
Leica								M2																																																																								
Leica																	M4							M4		M4-2				M4-P			M6															M6 TTL						MP																										
Leica																						M5																															M7																				M6							
Leica										M1														Leica CL																																									M-A (127)															
Non-Leica	Konica Hexar RF • 35mm Bessa • Cosina Voigtländer • Minolta CLE • Rollei 35 RF • Zeiss Ikon																																																																															

Model	1960s										1970s										1980s										1990s										2000s									
Model	60	61	62	63	64	65	66	67	68	69	70	71	72	73	74	75	76	77	78	79	80	81	82	83	84	85	86	87	88	89	90	91	92	93	94	95	96	97	98	99	00	01	02	03	04	05	06	07	08	09
Leicaflex					Leicaflex				SL					SL2																																				
Leica R																	R3				R4						R5	R6				R7					R8						R9							
