= Valbray =

Swiss watch company

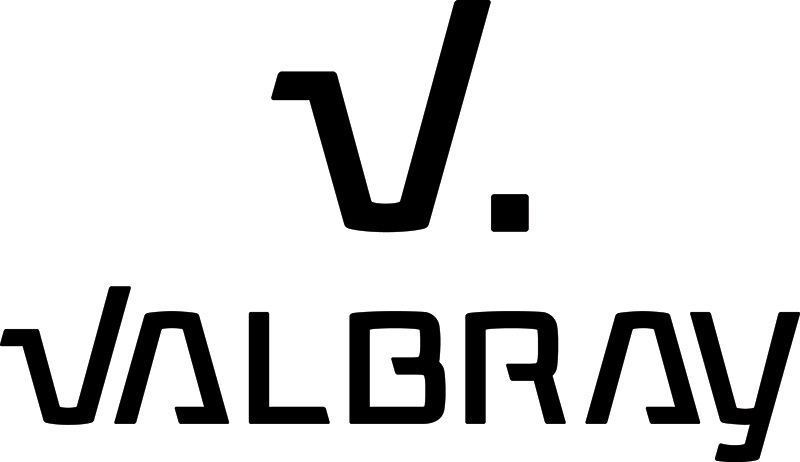
- Type: Private company
- Industry: Watch Making
- Founded: 2009
- Founder: Côme de Valbray and Olga Corsini
- Headquarters: Romanel sur Morges, Switzerland
- Area served: Worldwide
- Website: www.valbray.ch

Valbray is a Swiss watch company co-founded by Cômel de Valbray and Olga Corsini in 2009. The brand's collection is based on a patented, camera-iris-like design called Oculus that enables indications, mechanisms or art on the dial to be displayed or concealed by rotating the bezel.

== History ==
Côme de Valbray and Olga Corsini founded Valbray near Lausanne, Switzerland in March 2009. de Valbray had experience in microtechnology, business and watch manufacturing, as well as an interest in photography. Corsini had a degree in jewelry design and experience working for Gucci, Bulgari, and Chaumet.

The premise of Valbray's collection was to incorporate an element into the dial of a watch that was similar to the iris of a camera. Valbray invented and designed the mechanism over two years and called it the "Oculus". It was patented in 2010, the same year that the Valbray brand first exhibited four prototypes at the Baselworld watch fair.

In May 2013, Valbray opened a factory in Romanel sur Morges, Switzerland. By 2014, Valbray employed 12 people. Valbray manufacture watch cases, components, and straps.

== Watches ==
Valbray's main products are the Oculus V01 Chronograph and Oculus V02 Grand Dateur. All of Valbray's timepieces use Swiss Made, Automatic watch movements.

In 2014 Valbray worked with Leica Camera to create the Valbray EL 1 Chrono. Which stands for Ernst Leitz, one of the founders of Leica. One hundred of the watches were produced: 50 in a titanium case and 50 with a black diamond-like carbon finish.
