= Nicca =

Defunct Japanese camera manufacturer

Nicca IIIB (1951)

The Nicca Camera Co. Ltd. started as the optical workshop Kōgaku Seiki Co. in 1940, founded by former employees of Canon. Its first camera, the Nippon, a close copy of the Leica rangefinder camera, was produced in 1942.

Sears Tower Type-3 (1951)

In 1948, the company changed its name to the Nippon Camera Works, and a year later, to the Nicca Camera Works. It continued to build Leica-type rangefinder cameras, adding such features as flash synchronization, lever wind, a hinged film back, and projected viewfinder framing. Nicca also made cameras for Sears under the Tower name.

In 1958, the company was acquired by Yashica, which manufactured and re-labeled the Nicca 33 and Nicca III-L as the Yashica YE and Yashica YF respectively.
