= Leica Society International =

Leica Society International (formerly LHSA - The International Leica Society and Leica Historical Society of America) is an independent, nonprofit membership organization dedicated to everything regarding the Leica camera. It changed its name in 2023 to Leica Society International. Before then, it changed its name in 2012 to "LHSA - The International Leica Society" so as to be international rather than American.

The LHSA is mainly for collectors of Leica historical and rare pieces of Leica cameras and lenses. LHSA has also originated limited LHSA-editions of Leica cameras and lenses that Leica Camera AG has created, for example the Leica MP 3 0.72 LHSA Special Edition.

== Publications ==
Viewfinder, a quarterly journal, dedicated to Leica use and history.
