= Amici =

Amici may refer to:

- Amicus curiae, a legal Latin phrase translated to "friend of the court"
- Amici Principis, another term for cohors amicorum, "cohort of friends"
- Amici (crater), on the Moon
- Amici Forever, a band
- Amici prism, a type of compound dispersive prism used in spectrometers
- Amici roof prism, a type of reflecting prism used to deviate a beam of light by 90° while simultaneously inverting the image
- Andrea Amici (born 1971), Italian male retired sprinter
- Giovanni Battista Amici (1786–1863), Italian astronomer, microscopist, and botanist
- Giuliana Amici (born 1952), former Italian javelin thrower, later became masters athlete
- Amici di Maria De Filippi, Italian talent show
- Amici, the song of Phi Kappa Psi fraternity
- Amici della Domenica ("Sunday Friends"), the group that awarded the Strega Prize
- Opus sacerdotale Amici Israel, international Roman Catholic association founded in Rome in February 1926
