= Good Friday prayer =

Prayers prayed by Christians on Good Friday

Good Friday Prayer can refer to any of the prayers prayed by Christians on Good Friday, the Friday before Easter, or to all such prayers collectively.

== Eastern Orthodox and Byzantine-rite Catholic prayer on Good Friday ==
Eastern Orthodox Christians and many Byzantine-rite Catholics, who use the same liturgy, spend this day fasting from all food, to the extent that their health permits. Neither the Divine Liturgy nor the Liturgy of the Presanctified Gifts may be celebrated, thereby fasting from the Eucharist as well (with the exception of communion for the dying). Instead, they come together three times during the day for communal worship:

- Royal Hours in the forenoon, includes many Psalms, hymns, Old Testament and New Testament readings
- Vespers of Great and Holy Friday in the afternoon, commemorating the Descent from the Cross
- Matins of Great and Holy Saturday in the evening, reenacting the Burial of Jesus, with prayers praising him for his death and imminent Resurrection.

The prayers include commemoration of the events of Jesus' crucifixion and burial. During this time, the hymns do not forget the coming Resurrection. Holding both events in tension, the following troparia (hymns) are sung during the afternoon prayers while the epitaphios (shroud) is being carried to the tomb:

The noble Joseph, when he had taken down Thy most pure Body from the tree, wrapped it in fine linen, and anointed it with spices, and placed it in a new tomb.

Glory to the Father, and to the Son, and to the Holy Spirit, both now and ever, and unto ages of ages. Amen.

The angel came to the myrrh-bearing women at the tomb and said:
Myrrh is fitting for the dead, but Christ has shown Himself a stranger to corruption.

== Roman Catholic prayers ==
In the Roman Rite the first part of the Celebration of the Passion of the Lord consists of the reading or chanting of Isaiah 52:13–53:12, Hebrews 4:14–16, 5:7–9, and the Passion account from the Gospel of John, which is often divided between more than one cantor or reader. This part concludes with a series of prayers: for the Church, the Pope, the clergy and laity of the Church, those preparing for baptism, the unity of Christians, the Jewish people, those who do not believe in Christ, those who do not believe in God, those in public office, those in special need.

Some writers use the term "Good Friday Prayer" to refer to one particular prayer among these, namely the Good Friday Prayer for the Jews.

The Good Friday Prayer refers to the section of the Good Friday Service called "Solemn Intercessions" where the prayer is introduced, people pray for a minute followed by the prayer by the priest. The invitations "Let us kneel - Let us stand" may also be sung.

=== For the Holy Church ===
Let us pray, dearly beloved, for the holy Church of God, that our God and Lord be pleased to give her peace, to guard her and to unite her throughout the whole world and grant that, leading our life in tranquility and quiet, we may glorify God the Father almighty.

Almighty ever-living God, who in Christ revealed your glory to all the nations, watch over the works of your mercy, that your Church, spread throughout all the world, may persevere with steadfast faith in confessing your name. Through Christ our Lord. R. Amen.

For the Pope:

Let us pray
For our Holy Father, Pope ____________
That God who chose him to be bishop
May give him health and strength
To guide and govern God’s holy people.

Almighty and eternal God,
You guide all things by your word,
You govern all Christian people.
In your love protect the Pope you have chosen for us.
Under his leadership deepen our faith
And make us better Christians.
We ask this through Christ our Lord.
Amen.

For the Clergy and Laity of the Church:

Let us pray for N. our bishop,
For all bishops, priests, and deacons;
For all who have a special ministry in the Church
And for all God’s people.

Almighty and eternal God,
Your Spirit guides the Church
And makes it holy.
Listen to our prayers
And help each one of us
In his own vocation
To do you work more faithfully.
We ask this through Christ our Lord.
Amen.

For Those Preparing for Baptism:

Let us pray for those among us preparing for baptism,
That God in his mercy
Make them responsive to his love,
Forgive their sins through the waters of new birth,
And give them life in Jesus Christ our Lord.

Almighty and eternal God,
You continually bless your Church with new members.
Increase the faith and understanding
Of those among us preparing for baptism.
Give them a new birth in these living waters
And make them members of you chosen family.
We ask this through Christ our Lord.
Amen.

For Unity of Christians:

Let us pray
For all our brothers and sisters
Who share our faith in Jesus Christ,
That God may gather and keep together in one church
All those who seek the truth with sincerity.

Almighty and eternal God,
You keep together those you have united.
Look kindly on all who follow Jesus your Son.
We are all consecrated to you by our common baptism.
Make us one in the fullness of faith,
And keep us one in the fellowship of love.
We ask this through Christ our Lord.
Amen.

For the Jewish People:

Let us pray
For the Jewish people,
The first to hear the word of God,
That they may continue to grow in the love of his name
And in faithfulness to his covenant.

Almighty and eternal God,
Long ago you gave your promise to Abraham and his posterity.
Listen to your Church as we pray
That the people you first made your own
May arrive at the fullness of redemption.
We ask this through Christ our Lord.
Amen.

For Those Who Do Not Believe in Christ:

Let us pray
For those who do not believe in Christ,
That the light of the Holy Spirit
May show them the way to salvation.

Almighty and eternal God,
Enable those who do not acknowledge Christ
To find the truth
As they walk before you in sincerity of heart.
Help us to grow in love for one another,
To grasp more fully the mystery of your godhead,
And to become more perfect witnesses of your love
In the sight of men.
We ask this through Christ our Lord.
Amen.

For Those Who Do Not Believe in God:

Let us pray
For those who do not believe in God,
that they may find Him
By sincerely following all that is right.

Almighty and eternal God,
You created mankind
So that all might long to find you
And have peace when you are found,
Grant that, in spite of the hurtful things
That stand in their way,
They may all recognize in the lives of Christians
The tokens of your love and mercy,
And gladly acknowledge you
As the one true God and Father of us all.
We ask this through Christ our Lord.
Amen

For All in Public Office:

Let us pray
For those who serve us in public office,
That God may guide their minds and hearts,
So that all men may live in true peace and freedom.

Almighty and eternal God,
You know the longings of men’s hearts
And you protect their rights.
In your goodness
Watch over those in authority,
So that people everywhere may enjoy
Religious freedom, security, and peace.
We ask those through Christ our Lord.
Amen.

For Those in Special Need:

Let us pray, dear friends,
That God the almighty Father
May heal the sick,
Comfort the dying,
Give safety to travelers,
Free those unjustly deprived of liberty,
And rid the world of falsehood,
Hunger and disease.

Almighty, ever-living God,
You give strength to the weary
And new courage to those who have lost heart.
Hear the prayers of all who call on you in trouble
That they may have the joy of receiving your help in their need.
We ask this through Christ our Lord.
Amen.

== Anglican prayers ==
The 1662 Book of Common Prayer provides three collects for use on Good Friday.

Almighty God, we beseech thee graciously to behold this thy family, for which our Lord Jesus Christ was contented to be betrayed, and given up into the hands of wicked men, and to suffer death upon the cross, who now liveth and reigneth with thee and the Holy Ghost, ever one God, world without end. Amen.

Almighty and everlasting God, by whose Spirit the whole body of the Church is governed and sanctified: Receive our supplications and prayers, which we offer before thee for all estates of men in thy holy Church, that every member of the same, in his vocation and ministry, may truly and godly serve thee; through our Lord and Saviour Jesus Christ. Amen.

O merciful God, who hast made all men, and hatest nothing that thou hast made, nor wouldest the death of a sinner, but rather that he should be converted and live: Have mercy upon all Jews, Turks, Infidels, and Hereticks, and take from them all ignorance, hardness of heart, and contempt of thy word; and so fetch them home, blessed Lord, to thy flock, that they may be saved among the remnant of the true Israelites, and be made one fold under one shepherd, Jesus Christ our Lord, who liveth and reigneth with thee and the Holy Spirit, one God, world without end. Amen.

One of the Solemn Collects of the Anglican Episcopal Church of the United States says

Merciful God, creator of all the peoples of the earth and lover of souls: Have compassion on all who do not know you as you are revealed in your Son Jesus Christ; let your Gospel be preached with grace and power to those who have not heard it; turn the hearts of those who resist it; and bring home to your fold those who have gone astray; that there may be one flock under one shepherd, Jesus Christ our Lord.

== Lutheran prayers ==
The Bidding Prayer used in the Lutheran Book of Worship and Evangelical Lutheran Worship follow the traditional format. There is a bid, "Let us pray for..." which is followed by silence. The presiding minister will end the silent prayer with a collect and a new bid will be offered. The Bidding Prayer ends with the Our Father.

The following is the Good Friday prayer used by the Evangelical Lutherans Synod:

Almighty and everlasting God, You willed that Your Son should bear for us the pains of the cross, that You might remove from us the power of the adversary: Help us to remember and give thanks for our Lord’s Passion that we may obtain remission of sin and redemption from everlasting death; through the same, our Lord Jesus Christ. Amen.

== Good Friday Prayer for the Jews ==
There have been debates about antisemitism in the Good Friday Prayer since the 1950s.
