= Astronomical filter =

Telescope accessory used to improve details of viewed objects

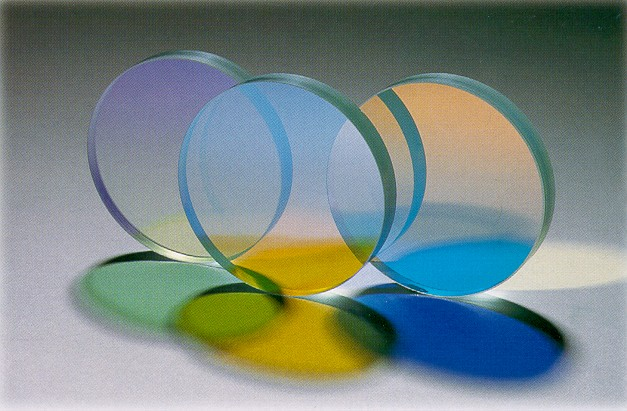
Ultraviolet filters for protecting a camera from ultraviolet radiation

An astronomical filter is a telescope accessory consisting of an optical filter used by amateur astronomers to improve the details and contrast of celestial objects, either for viewing or for astrophotography. Research astronomers, on the other hand, use various band-pass filters for photometry on telescopes, in order to obtain measurements which reveal objects' astrophysical properties, such as stellar classification and placement of a celestial body on its Wien curve.

Most astronomical filters work by blocking a specific part of the color spectrum above and below a bandpass, significantly increasing the signal-to-noise ratio of the interesting wavelengths, and so making the object gain detail and contrast. While the color filters transmit certain colors from the spectrum and are usually used for observation of the planets and the Moon, the polarizing filters work by adjusting the brightness, and are usually used for the Moon. The broad-band and narrow-band filters transmit the wavelengths that are emitted by the nebulae (by the hydrogen and oxygen atoms), and are frequently used for reducing the effects of light pollution.

Filters have been used in astronomy at least since the solar eclipse of May 12, 1706.

== Solar filters ==
=== White light filters ===
Solar filters block most of the sunlight to avoid any damage to the eyes. Proper filters are usually made from a durable glass or polymer film that transmits only 0.00001% of the light. For safety, solar filters must be securely fitted over the objective of a refracting telescope or aperture of a reflecting telescope so that the body does not heat up significantly.

Small solar filters threaded behind eyepieces do not block the radiation entering the scope body, causing the telescope to heat up greatly, and it is not unknown for them to shatter from thermal shock. Therefore, most experts do not recommend such solar filters for eyepieces, and some stockists refuse to sell them and remove them from telescope packages. According to NASA: "Solar filters designed to thread into eyepieces that are often provided with inexpensive telescopes are also unsafe. These glass filters can crack unexpectedly from overheating when the telescope is pointed at the Sun, and retinal damage can occur faster than the observer can move the eye from the eyepiece."

Solar filters are used to safely observe and photograph the Sun, which despite being white, may appear as a yellow-orange disk. A telescope with these filters attached can directly and properly view details of solar features, especially sunspots and granulation on the surface, as well as solar eclipses and transits of the inferior planets Mercury and Venus across the solar disk.

=== Narrowband filters ===
The Herschel wedge is a prism-based device combined with a neutral-density filter that directs most of the heat and ultraviolet rays out of the telescope, generally giving better results than most filter types. The H-alpha filter transmits the H-alpha spectral line for viewing solar flares and prominences invisible through common filters. These H-alpha filters are much narrower than those used for night H-alpha observing (see Nebular filters below), passing only 0.05 nm (0.5 angstrom) for one common model, compared with 3 nm–12 nm or more for night filters. Due to the narrow bandpass and temperature shifts often telescopes like that are tunable within about a ±0.05 nm.

NASA included the following filters on the Solar Dynamics Observatory, of which only one is visible to human eyes (450.0 nm): 450.0 nm, 170.0 nm, 160.0 nm, 33.5 nm, 30.4 nm, 19.3 nm, 21.1 nm, 17.1 nm, 13.1 nm, and 9.4 nm. These were chosen for temperature, instead of particular emission lines, as are many narrowband filters such as the H-alpha line mentioned above.

== Color filters ==
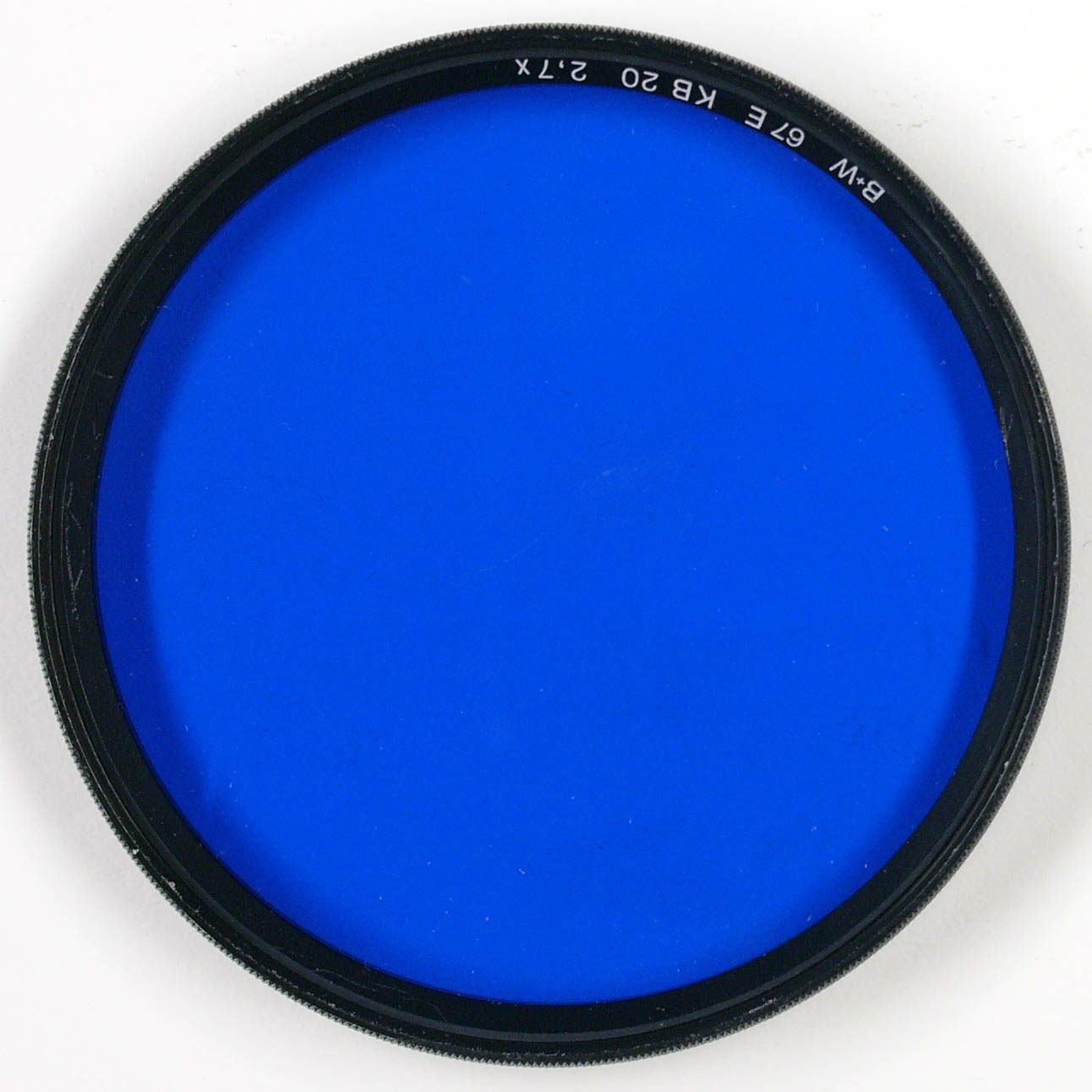
A blue color filter

Color filters work by absorption/transmission, and can tell which part of the spectrum they are reflecting and transmitting. Filters can be used to increase contrast and enhance the details of the Moon and planets. All of the visible spectrum colors each have a filter, and every color filter is used to bring a certain lunar and planetary feature; for example, the #8 yellow filter is used to show Mars's maria and Jupiter's belts. The Wratten system is the standard number system used to refer to the color filter types. It was first manufactured by Kodak in 1909.

Professional filters are also colored, but their bandpass centers are placed around other midpoints (such as in the UBVRI and Cousins systems).

Some of common color filters and their uses are:

- Chromatic aberration filters: Used for reduction of the purplish halo, caused by chromatic aberration of refracting telescopes. Such halo can obscure features of bright objects, especially Moon and planets. These filters have no effect on observing faint objects.
- Red: Reduces sky brightness, particularly during daylight and twilight observations. Improves definition of maria, ice, and polar areas of Mars. Improves contrast of blue clouds against background of Jupiter and Saturn.
- Deep yellow: Improves resolution of atmospheric features of Venus, Jupiter (especially in polar regions), and Saturn. Increases contrast of polar caps, clouds, ice and dust storms on Mars. Enhances comet tails.
- Dark green: Improves cloud patterns on Venus. Reduces sky brightness during daylight observation of Venus. Increases contrast of ice and polar caps on Mars. Improves visibility of the Great Red Spot on Jupiter and other features in Jupiter atmosphere. Enhances white clouds and polar regions on Saturn.
- Medium blue: Enhances contrast of Moon. Increases contrast of faint shading of Venus clouds. Enhances surface features, clouds, ice and dust storms on Mars. Enhances definition of boundaries between features in atmospheres of Jupiter and Saturn. Improves definition of comet gas tails.

== Moon filters ==
Neutral density filters, also known in astronomy as Moon filters, are another approach for contrast enhancement and glare reduction. They work simply by blocking some of the object's light to enhance the contrast. Neutral density filters are mainly used in traditional photography, but are used in astronomy to enhance lunar and planetary observations.

== Polarizing filters ==
Polarizing filters adjust the brightness of images to a better level for observing, but much less so than solar filters. With these types of filter, the range of transmission varies from 3% to 40%. They are usually used for the observation of the Moon, but may also be used for planetary observation. They consist of two polarizing layers in a rotating aluminum cell, which changes the amount of transmission of the filter by rotating them. This reduction in brightness and improvement in contrast can reveal the lunar surface features and details, especially when it is near full. Polarizing filters should not be used in place of solar filters designed specially for observing the sun.

== Nebular filters ==
=== Narrowband ===
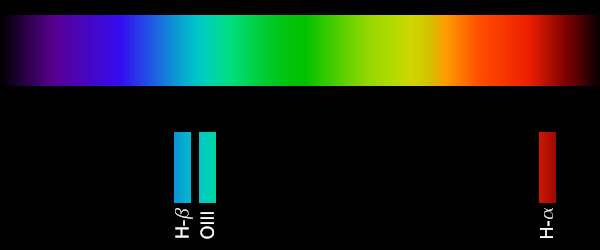
The three main spectral lines that narrow-band filters transmit

Narrow-band filters are astronomical filters which transmit only a narrow band of spectral lines from the spectrum (usually 22 nm bandwidth, or less). They are mainly used for nebulae observation. Emission nebulae mainly radiate the doubly ionized oxygen in the visible spectrum, which emits near 500 nm wavelength. These nebulae also radiate weakly at 486 nm, the Hydrogen-beta line.

There are two main types of narrowband filters: Ultra-high contrast (UHC), and specific emission line(s) filters.

==== Specific emission line filters ====
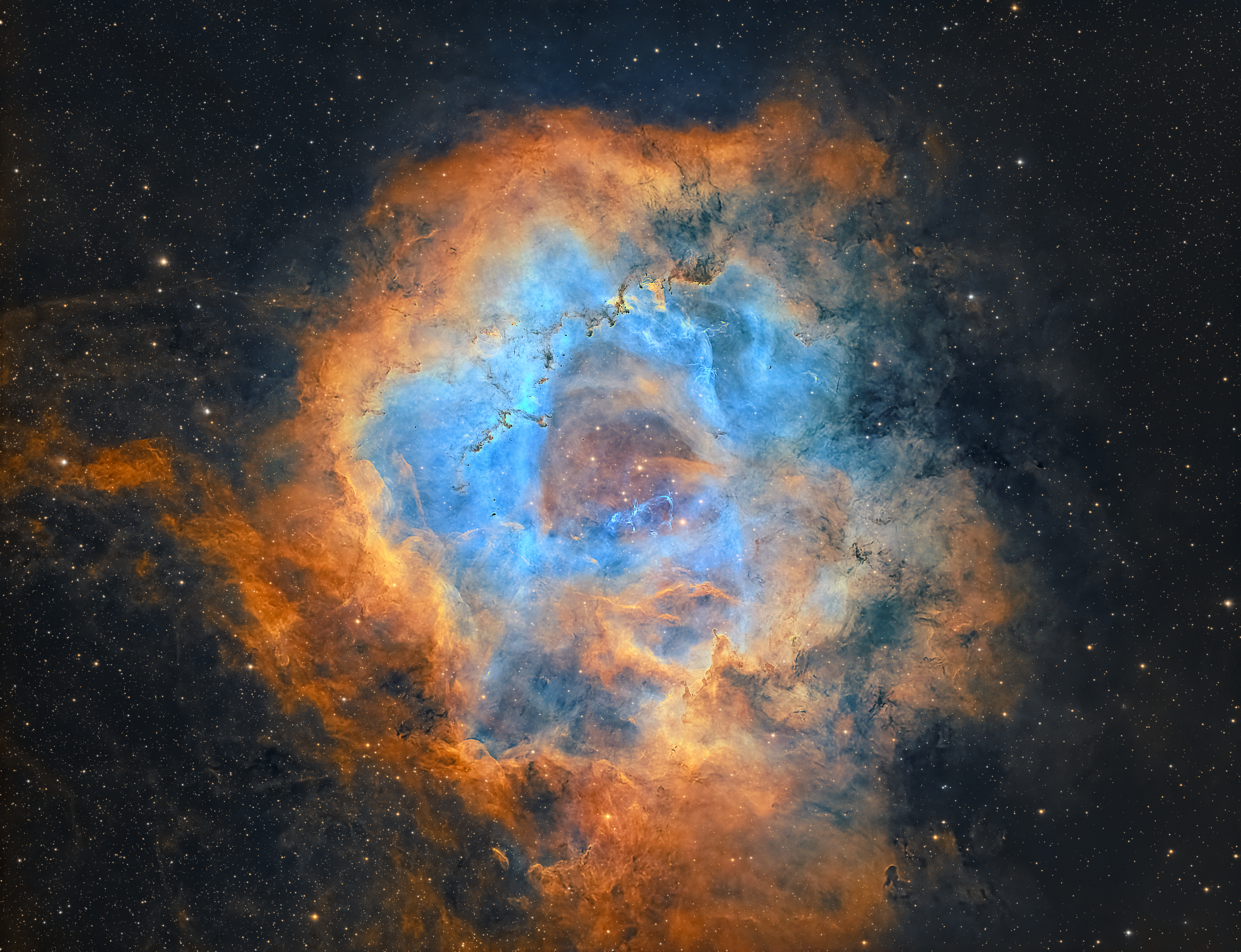
The Rosette Nebula capture with narrowband filters (H-Alpha, O-III, S-II) and processed in the Hubble Palette. S-II is placed in the Red Channel, H-Alpha in the Green Channel, and O-III in the Blue Channel

Specific emission line (or lines) filters are used to isolate lines of specific elements or molecules to see their distribution within Nebulae. By combining the images from different filters they may also be used to produce false color images. Common filters are often used with the Hubble Space Telescope, forming the so-called HST-palette, with colors assigned as such: Red = S-II; Green = H-alpha; Blue = O-III. These filters are commonly specified with a second figure in nm, which refers to how wide a band is passed, which may cause it to exclude or include other lines. For example, H-alpha at 656 nm, may pick up N-II (at 658–654 nm), some filters will block most of the N-II if they are 3 nm wide.

Commonly used lines / filters are:

- H-Alpha Hα / Ha (656 nm) from the Balmer series is emitted by HII regions and is one of the stronger sources.
- H-Beta Hβ / Hb (486 nm) from the Balmer series is visible from stronger sources.
- O-III (496 nm and 501 nm) filters allow for both of the Oxygen-III lines to pass through. This is strong in many emission nebulae.
- S-II (672 nm) filters show the Sulfur-II line.

Less common lines/filters:

- He-II (468 nm)
- He-I: (587 nm)
- O-I: (630 nm)
- Ar-III: (713 nm)
- CA-II Ca-K/Ca-H: (393 and 396 nm) For solar observing, shows the sun with the K and H Fraunhofer lines
- N-II (658 nm and 654 nm) Often included in wider H-alpha filters
- Methane (889 nm) allowing clouds to be seen on the gas giants, Venus and (with filter) the Sun.

==== Ultra-high contrast filters ====
Known commonly as UHC filters, these filters consist of things which allow multiple strong common emission lines to pass through, which also has the effect of the similar Light Pollution Reduction filters (see below) of blocking most light sources.

The UHC filters range from 484 to 506 nm. It transmits both the O-III and H-beta spectral lines, blocks a large fraction of light pollution, and brings the details of planetary nebula and most of emission nebulae under a dark sky.

=== Broadband ===
The broadband, or light pollution reduction (LPR), filters are designed to block the sodium and mercury vapor light, and also block natural skyglow such as the auroral light. This allows observing nebulae from the city and light polluted skies. Broadband filters differ from narrowband with the range of wavelengths transmission. LED lighting is more broadband so it is not blocked, although white LEDs have a considerably lower output around 480 nm, which is close to O III and H-beta wavelength. Broadband filters have a wider range because a narrow transmission range causes a fainter image of sky objects, and since the work of these filters is revealing the details of nebulae from light polluted skies, it has a wider transmission for more brightness. These filters are particularly designed for galaxy observation and photography, and not useful with other deep sky objects such as emission nebulae. However, they can still improve the contrast between the DSOs and the background sky, which may clarify the image.

== See also ==
- Infrared cut-off filter
- List of telescope parts and construction
- Optical filter
- Photographic filter
- Photometric system
- UBV photometric system
