= Pope Pius XI and Judaism =

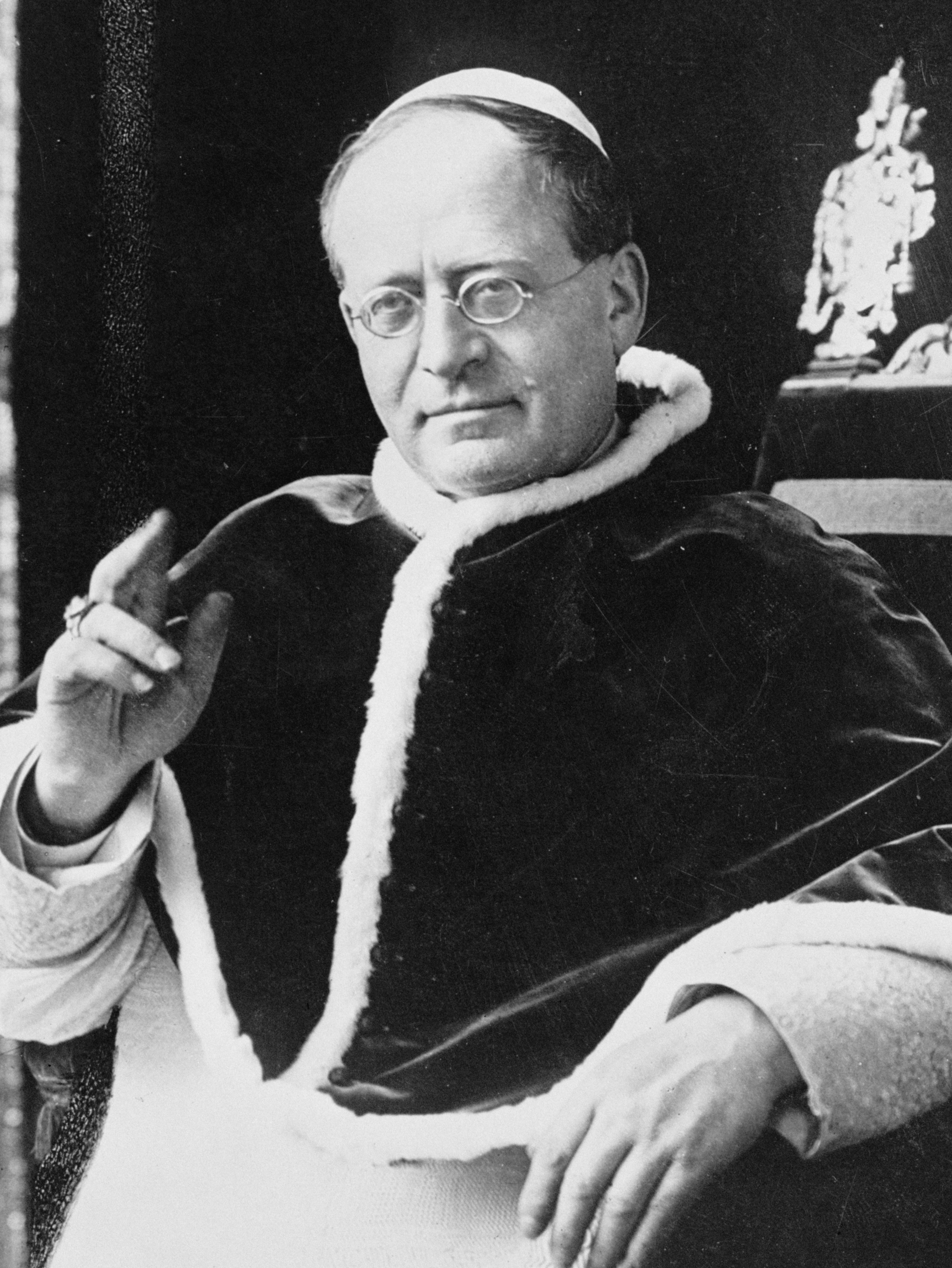
Pope Pius XI in 1939

The relations between Pope Pius XI and Judaism during his tenure from 1922 to 1939 are generally regarded as good. The pontiff was particularly and vocally opposed to antisemitism, an important issue at the time when Nazi Germany was rising. In 1938, he famously declared, "Spiritually we are all Semites".

== Opus sacerdotale Amici Israel ==
The Clerical Association of Friends of Israel was an organization of Catholic priests, including many bishops and cardinals, that operated within the Catholic Church from 1926 to 1928. Its purpose was to convert the Jews to Catholicism.

It requested that the word "perfidis", which described the Jews during the Good Friday Prayer for the Jews, be removed. The Congregation of Rites responded on 25 March 1928 by ordering the suppression of the Association. Pope Pius XI had asked Alfredo Ildefonso Schuster, a member of the Friends of Israel and a prominent Benedictine abbot who became Cardinal Archbishop of Milan in 1929, to explore a compromise. The Secretary of State Rafael Merry del Val replied that the group had become tools of the Jews' plot to "penetrate everywhere in Society" and "reconstitute the reign of Israel in opposition to Christ and his Church." He ordered the group to confine itself to prayers only. Pius said that del Val's response caused him "a feeling of pain". The official publication La Civiltà Cattolica explained the action in a story headlined The Judaic Danger and the "Friends of Israel." Its author drew a distinction between race-based anti-Semitism, which it condemned, and the need for Catholics to maintain a "healthy perception of danger coming from the Jews" through their influence on politics and religion as well as their association with revolution since 1789.

== Letter from Edith Stein ==
Edith Stein was a German-Jewish philosopher, a saint of the Catholic Church, who was murdered at Auschwitz. In April 1933 she wrote a letter to Pope Pius XI, in which she denounced the Nazi regime and asked the Pope to openly denounce the regime "to put a stop to this abuse of Christ's name."

As a child of the Jewish people who, by the grace of God, for the past eleven years has also been a child of the Catholic Church, I dare to speak to the Father of Christianity about that which oppresses millions of Germans. For weeks we have seen deeds perpetrated in Germany which mock any sense of justice and humanity, not to mention love of neighbor. For years the leaders of National Socialism have been preaching hatred of the Jews. But the responsibility must fall, after all, on those who brought them to this point and it also falls on those who keep silent in the face of such happenings. Everything that happened and continues to happen on a daily basis originates with a government that calls itself "Christian." For weeks not only Jews but also thousands of faithful Catholics in Germany, and, I believe, all over the world, have been waiting and hoping for the Church of Christ to raise its voice to put a stop to this abuse of Christ’s name."

— Edith Stein, Letter to Pope Pius XI.

Stein's letter received no answer, and it is not known for sure whether Pius XI even read it. This until her letter to Pope Pius XI and related correspondence were finally released from Vatican archives. William Doino explains that there was an answer to Stein by Cardinal Pacelli but the letter was sent to Stein’s abbot, Raphael Walzer, because it was he who had mailed Stein's letter to the Vatican (following protocol the letter was not sent to Pius XI directly, but first given to Archabbot Raphael Walzer with a request that he forward it to the Vatican). Cardinal Pacelli sent then what Doino call a "warm and supportive reply" but speculates that it may never have been received due to Nazi war time surveillance. Pacelli's reply states: "I leave it to you to inform the sender [Edith Stein] in an opportune way that her letter has been dutifully presented to His Holiness [Pope Pius XI]."

== Opposition to Nazism and racism ==
=== Speech to Belgian pilgrims 1938 ===
Ronald Rychlak notes that in September 1938 Pius XI stated:

Mark well that in the Catholic Mass, Abraham is our Patriarch and forefather. Anti-Semitism is incompatible with the lofty thought which that fact expresses. It is a movement with which we Christians can have nothing to do. No, no I say to you it is impossible for a Christian to take part in anti-Semitism. It is inadmissible. Through Christ and in Christ we are the spiritual progeny of Abraham. Spiritually we are all Semites.

Martin Rhonheimer asserts that above passage is cited constantly for apologetics purposes but points out a line which is missing (without ellipses) in the text in which Pius asserts "We recognize the right of all people to defend themselves, to take measures against all who threaten their legitimate interests." He comments that "It is reasonable to understand the words as meaning: legitimate defense against undue Jewish influence, Yes; 'anti-Semitism,' hatred of the Jews as a people, No." and further notes that "Had the Church really wanted to mount effective opposition to the fate that awaited the Jews, it would have had to condemn—from the very start—not only racism but anti-Semitism in any form, including the social anti-Semitism espoused by not a few churchmen. This the Church never did: not in 1933, not in 1937, nor in 1938 or 1939." David Kertzer interprets Pius's as meaning "Murdering Jews, burning down their homes and stores, humiliating them, these were all unchristian and inhumane. But taking 'legitimate' actions to defend the rest of the population from the Jews, this was something he did not oppose." The Pope's comments were made to a group of Belgian pilgrims and were never reported in the Vatican's own newspaper but did appear in other European Catholic papers. Saul Friedländer wrote "He did not criticise the ongoing persecution of the Jews, and he included a reference to the right of self-defense (undue Jewish influence). Nonetheless his statement was clear: Christians could not condone anti-Semitism of the Nazi kind”.

In the 1939 issue of B'nai B'rith's National Jewish Monthly features him on the front cover and writes, "Regardless of their personal beliefs, men and women everywhere who believe in democracy and the rights of man have hailed the firm and uncompromising stand of Pope Pius XI against Fascist brutality, paganism, and racial theories. In his annual Christmas message to the College of Cardinals, the great Pontiff vigorously denounced Fascism... The first international voice in the world to be raised in stern condemnation of the ghastly injustice perpetrated upon the Jewish people by brutal tyrannies was Pope Pius XI".

== Support for refugees ==
Also of note is Pius XI's support for British efforts to help Jewish and other refugees: the Holy See sent out requests to its representatives throughout the world to assist those fleeing oppression and racial persecution; see Cardinal Pacelli's circular telegrams of November 30, 1938, and January 10, 1939, in Actes et Documents 6, pp. 48–50, and Pius XI's letter to the cardinal archbishops of Boston, Philadelphia, Chicago, Quebec, and Buenos Aires, pp. 50ff.

== Reaction to racial laws ==
In Jan. 1939, the Jewish National Monthly reports "the only bright spot in Italy has been the Vatican, where fine humanitarian statements by the Pope have been issuing regularly". When Mussolini's anti-Semitic decrees began depriving Jews of employment in Italy, Pius XI, on his own initiative, admitted Professor Vito Volterra, a famous Italian Jewish mathematician, into the Pontifical Academy of Science.

== Encyclical condemning Nazism ==
Multiple breaches in the concordat of 1933 led the Church to forcefully condemn Nazism in the 1937 encyclical Mit brennender Sorge. This encyclical "condemned the neopaganism of the Nazi ideology – especially its theory of racial superiority". The encyclical was drafted by Cardinal Michael von Faulhaber with an introduction from the future Pope Pius XII who had previously submitted his own draft that Pius rejected for being too weak.

The encyclical was read from the pulpits of all German Catholic churches and was the first official denunciation of Nazism made by any major organization.

== Nazi retaliation against the Church ==
The Nazis were infuriated, and in retaliation closed and sealed all the presses that had printed it and took numerous vindictive measures against the Church, including staging a long series of immorality trials of the Catholic clergy.

According to Bokenkotter Nazi reprisals against the Church in Germany followed thereafter, including "staged prosecutions of monks for homosexuality, with the maximum of publicity". According to Catholic scholars Ehler and Morrall the initial Nazi response to the encyclical, a cry for the denunciation of the Concordant due to the Pope's interference ("but on second thoughts the Government did not do so"), the persecution of the Church lessened in subsequent years with the attitudes of both sides stabilising during the war.

This was in part influenced by the number of Catholics who now came under the orbit of German control in the wake of the Anschluss and the extension of occupied territories, leading to a Catholic population that now at least equalled that of Protestants. After the war the Concordat remained in place and the Church was restored to its previous position.

== Role of Eugenio Pacelli ==
When Lord Rothschild, a prominent British leader, organized a protest meeting in London against Kristallnacht, Eugenio Pacelli, Vatican secretary of state, acting on behalf of Pius XI, who was then ill, sent a statement of solidarity with the persecuted Jews; the statement was read publicly at the meeting"

When Pius XI died on February 10, 1939, the world praised him for his opposition to the Nazi and fascist regimes, as well as for his vocal opposition to antisemitism. Certain favourable opinions of Pius XI were subsequently used to attack the perceived silence of Pope Pius XII.

== Posthumous praise ==
On Feb. 12, 1939, Bernard Joseph wrote on behalf of the Executive of the Jewish Agency to the Latin patriarch of Jerusalem: "'In Common with the whole of civilized humanity, the Jewish people mourns the loss of one of the greatest exponents of the cause of international peace and good will...More than once did we have occasion to be deeply grateful...for the deep concern which he expressed for the fate of the persecuted Jews of Central Europe. His noble efforts on their behalf will ensure for him for all time a warm place in the memories of the Jewish people wherever they live'

Feb. 17, 1939, the Jewish historian Cecil Roth published the obituary "Pope Pius and the Jews: A Champion of Toleration" in the Jewish Chronicle of London, in which he "wrote movingly of his private audience with the aged pontiff, during which Pius XI assured Roth of the papacy's opposition to anti-Semitism. Roth hailed Pius XI as that 'courageous voice raised unfalteringly and unwearingly...protesting oppression, condemning racial madness...This was an aspect which he appreciated to the full, and earned his memory an undying claim to the gratitude of the Jewish people'"
