= Diagonal mirror =

A diagonal mirror is a flat mirror used to produce a right-angle bend in a light path. Examples of diagonal mirrors include:

- The secondary mirror used in a Newtonian telescope
- The tertiary mirror used in a Nasmyth telescope
- A star diagonal right-angled telescope eyepiece mount
- An optical Edwardian parlour entertainment device also known as a Zograscope
