= Delta prism =

A delta prism is an optical element providing a compact folded form of the Dove prism. When used in the normal orientation, the prism inverts the image (that is, rotates it 180 degrees); rotating the orientation results in image rotation to other arbitrary angles.

The base surface must be fabricated with a mirror coating to make it reflective. The other two surfaces are not coated, since they are internally reflective from the ray angles and high-index glass.

The simple form of the prism also results in image mirroring along one meridian but not the other, a consequence of the odd parity of three reflections involved. If the base surface is roofed, the number of reflections increases to an even four. The roofed prism thus acts as an image erector, rotating the image without the mirroring effect of the unroofed form.

The delta prism is named for its shape being similar to the uppercase Greek letter Δ (delta).
