= Dove prism =

Type of reflective prism

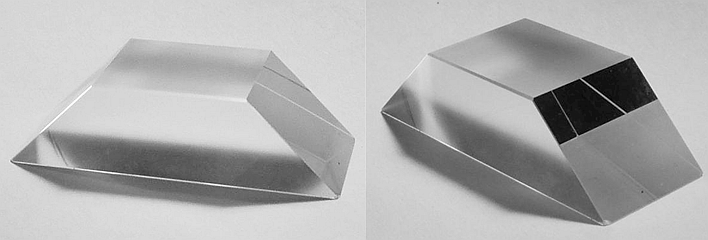
A Dove prism

The path of a beam through a Dove prism

A Dove prism is a type of reflective prism which is used to invert an image. Dove prisms are shaped from a truncated right-angle prism. The Dove prism is named for its inventor, Heinrich Wilhelm Dove. Although the shape of this prism is similar to the shape described by a dovetail joint, the etymology of the two is unrelated.

A beam of light travelling parallel to the longitudinal axis, entering one of the sloped faces of the prism, undergoes total internal reflection from the inside of the longest (bottom) face and emerges from the opposite sloped face. Images passing through the prism are flipped (mirrored), and because only one reflection takes place, the image is also inverted but not laterally transposed.

Refraction at the entrance and exit surfaces results in substantial image astigmatism when used in convergent light. Thus the Dove prism is used almost exclusively for images appearing at infinity.

If the flat hypotenuse surface of a Dove prism is cut into a roof shape, the result is an Amici roof prism.

== Rotation ==
A reflection in one axis of a plane is always equivalent to a reflection and rotation in two other axes (with the angle between the source and image being twice the angle between the source and reflection axis of the prism). Thus, Dove prisms can be used to create beam rotators, which have applications in fields such as interferometry, astronomy, and pattern recognition.

Lesso and Padgett (1999) and Moreno et al. (2003, 2004) found that there is a change in the state of polarization of a beam of light on passing through a rotated dove prism. Polarization rotation in the infrared has been known for much longer (Johnston 1977). The polarization-transforming properties of dove prisms are of particular interest because they can influence the signal measurement of the scientific instrument.

== See also ==
- Delta prism
- Polarization rotator
