= Icarus (crater) =

Crater on the Moon

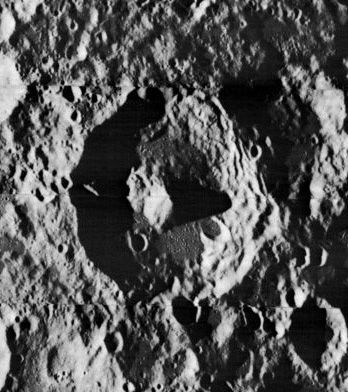
- Lunar Orbiter 2 image
- Coordinates: 5.3°S 173.2°W
- Diameter: 96 km
- Depth: Unknown
- Colongitude: 174° at sunrise
- Formation: Imbrian
- Eponym: Icarus

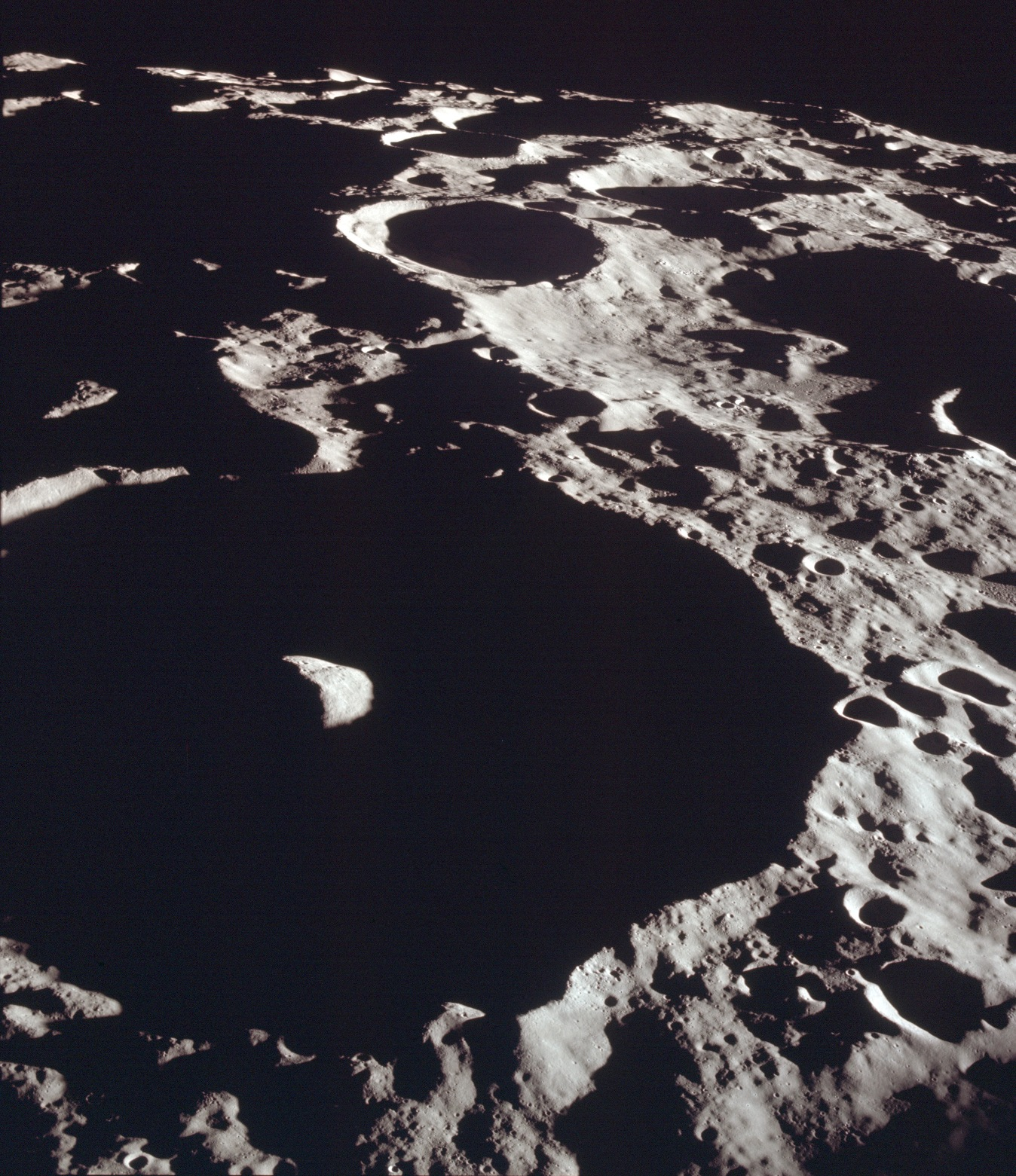
Oblique view of Icarus, facing south, from Apollo 11. Note that the central peak of the crater is illuminated, demonstrating that it is higher than the rim.

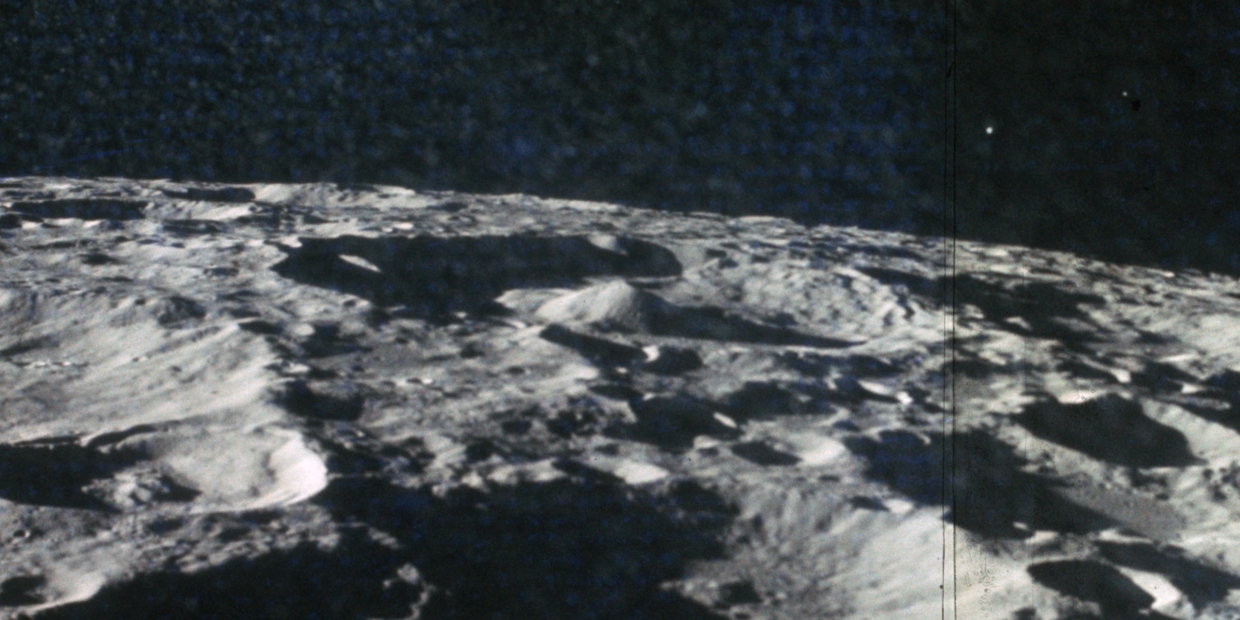
Oblique view from Apollo 17

Icarus is a lunar impact crater that lies on the Moon's far side. It is located to the west of the huge walled plain named Korolev, and less than two crater diameters to the east of the crater Daedalus. To the south of Icarus is the smaller Amici.

This formation dates to the Imbrian period on the lunar geologic timescale. It has a worn rim and a relatively wide inner wall. A small crater lies across the southern rim, and the side bulges outward slightly along the southwestern face. There is a disproportionately tall central peak located near the crater midpoint. This rise is unusual in that it is taller than the outer rim; most peaks are only about half the crater depth. The remainder of the floor is relatively flat in the eastern half and slightly more irregular to the west.

Icarus was named by the Apollo 15 crew. Composer Ralph Towner made a tune called Icarus which was released in an album of the Paul Winter consort. One member of the consort was cellist David Darling, whose brother-in-law was astronaut Joseph P. Allen. Allen served as mission scientist while a member of the astronaut support crew for Apollo 15. He gave the Apollo 15 crew a tape of the Paul Winter consort. the Apollo 15 crew named two moon craters after Ralph Towner's compositions "Ghost Beads" and "Icarus".

== Satellite craters ==
By convention these features are identified on lunar maps by placing the letter on the side of the crater midpoint that is closest to Icarus.

Icarus	Latitude	Longitude	Diameter
D	4.3° S	171.2° W	68 km
E	5.2° S	168.8° W	12 km
H	7.8° S	169.4° W	32 km
J	7.3° S	170.9° W	32 km
Q	7.8° S	176.2° W	41 km
V	3.9° S	176.0° W	36 km
X	2.2° S	175.5° W	43 km
