= Star diagonal =

Angled mirror or prism used in telescopes

A star diagonal, erecting lens, or diagonal mirror is an angled mirror or prism used in telescopes that allows viewing from a direction that is perpendicular to the usual eyepiece axis. It allows more convenient and comfortable viewing when the telescope is pointed at or near the zenith (i.e. directly overhead). The resulting image is right side up, but is reversed from left to right.

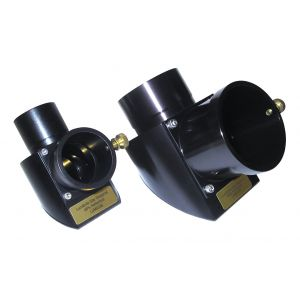
Two examples of star diagonals

== Types of diagonals ==
Star diagonals are available in 0.965", 1.25", and 2" diameters. The 2" diagonals allow longer-focal length, low-power 2" barrel eyepieces for a wider field of view. Star diagonals come in all price ranges, from as low as a few dollars up to hundreds of dollars.

=== Mirror (reflective) diagonals ===
These diagonals (often called star diagonals) use a mirror set at a 45° angle inside the diagonal to turn the telescope's image at a 90° angle to the rear cell. Mirror diagonals produce an image in the eyepiece that is correctly oriented vertically, but is reversed left-to-right horizontally. Mirror diagonals cost less to produce compared to a prism, and that they do not introduce any color errors to the image. The major disadvantage of mirror diagonals is that unless the reflective coating is properly applied they can scatter light rendering lower image contrast compared to a 90° prism. When exposed to open air or in areas with high humidity, over time the raw metallic layer naturally reacts with oxygen creating a layer that scatters light and lowers reflectivity. Protective coatings can be applied to the reflective layer to help prevent loss of reflectivity. With short-focal length instruments, a mirror diagonal is preferred over a prism.

Some star diagonals use a type of mirror with a multi-layer dielectric design, called dielectric mirror or also Bragg mirror to reflect up to 99% of the incoming light. Compared to normal mirrors, these produce a brighter and higher contrast image. These mirrors can produce better reflectivity over a range of wavelengths.

=== Prism diagonals ===
A prism diagonal uses a simple 90°-angle prism, pentaprism, or an Amici roof prism rather than a mirror to bend the optical path.

On telescopes with a longer focal ratios, a well-made 90° prism diagonal is the optimum choice to deliver the highest image contrast. In some special cases however, the color dispersion effects of a prism diagonal can be used to advantage to improve the performance of undercorrected refractor objectives (regardless of focal length) by shifting the spherical and color correction of the objective closer to the design optimum. The natural color dispersion properties (overcorrection) of the prism works to lessen or nullify the undercorrection of the objective lens.

A well-made conventional 90° prism star diagonal can transmit as much or more light as a mirror, and do so with higher image contrast since there is no possibility of light scattering from a reflective metallic surface as in a mirror diagonal. Also a prism will never degrade over time as a mirror will since there is no reflective metal coating to degrade from oxidation. However, prism diagonals may introduce chromatic aberration when used with short focal-length scopes although this is not a problem with the popular Schmidt-Cassegrain and Maksutov-Cassegrain telescopes, which have long focal lengths.

==== Pentaprism ====
A pentaprism provides the same inverted image orientation as viewing without a diagonal would. A simple 90°-angle prism provides the same "flipped" or mirror reversed image as a mirror diagonal. Pentaprism diagonals are specialized diagonals that can provide a correctly oriented image.

==== Amici prism ====
An Amici prism is a type of roof prism which splits the image in two parts and thus allows an upright image without left-right mirroring. This means that what is seen in the eyepiece is the same as what is seen when looking at the sky, or a star chart or lunar map.

The disadvantage of typical "correct image" Amici roof prism diagonals is that the total amount of light transmitted is less and the multiple reflections can introduce optical aberrations. At higher magnifications (>100×), brighter objects have a bright line through the object viewed. Therefore, most Amici roof prisms are more appropriate for low-power viewing or in spotting scopes for terrestrial rather than astronomical use.

They are available in two types: with a 90º angle (like an ordinary star diagonal) and with a 45º angle. Such prisms are often used in spotting scopes for terrestrial viewing, mostly with a 45º angle. While highly effective at lower powers, most Amici prisms are made for terrestrial use, where atmospheric conditions generally limit useful magnification to around 60×–70x. However, Amici prisms can produce reflections or spikes through the center of the image because both sides of the prism meet at the prism edge.

== Alignment ==
Precise alignment of optical components is essential for achieving optimal performance. Misalignment can lead to optical aberrations—such as coma—that degrade image quality, particularly at high magnifications. Optical design expert Peter Ceravolo notes that coma often stems from misalignment, emphasizing that accurate optical analysis requires components to be properly installed and aligned.

== See also ==
- Herschel Wedge
- Amici prism
- List of telescope parts and construction
