= Amici (crater) =

Crater on the Moon

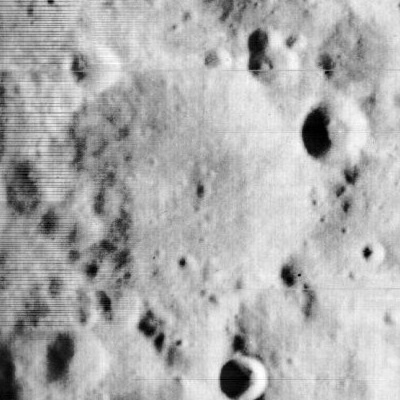
- Lunar Orbiter 1 image
- Coordinates: 9.9°S 172.1°W
- Diameter: 52.03 km (32.33 mi)
- Depth: Unknown
- Colongitude: 172° at sunrise
- Eponym: Giovanni Battista Amici

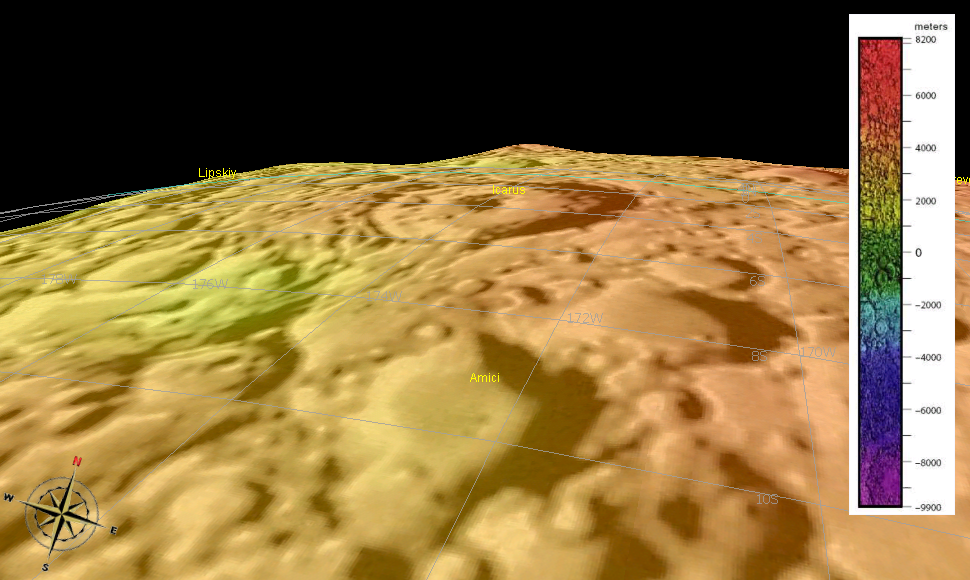
Computer-generated image of the crater Amici (bottom center), colorized to show altitude (see key on right).

Amici is a lunar impact crater located on the rugged far side of the Moon. It lies south of the larger crater Icarus, and north of McKellar.

The rim of Amici has been eroded and distorted by subsequent impacts, giving it a somewhat polygonal shape. The interior floor has no notable impact formations, but is pockmarked by tiny craterlets. A valley extends from southern end of the crater toward the satellite crater Amici M.

This crater is named after the Italian astronomer and optician Giovanni Battista Amici (1786-1863). Its designation was formally adopted by the International Astronomical Union in 1970.

== Satellite craters ==
By convention these features are identified on lunar maps by placing the letter on the side of the crater midpoint that is closest to Amici.

Amici	Latitude	Longitude	Diameter
M	11.8° S	171.9° W	105 km
N	11.8° S	172.5° W	39 km
P	12.3° S	174.1° W	31 km
Q	12.0° S	175.7° W	47 km
R	11.4° S	175.2° W	34 km
T	9.7° S	174.0° W	43 km
U	8.7° S	175.5° W	96 km

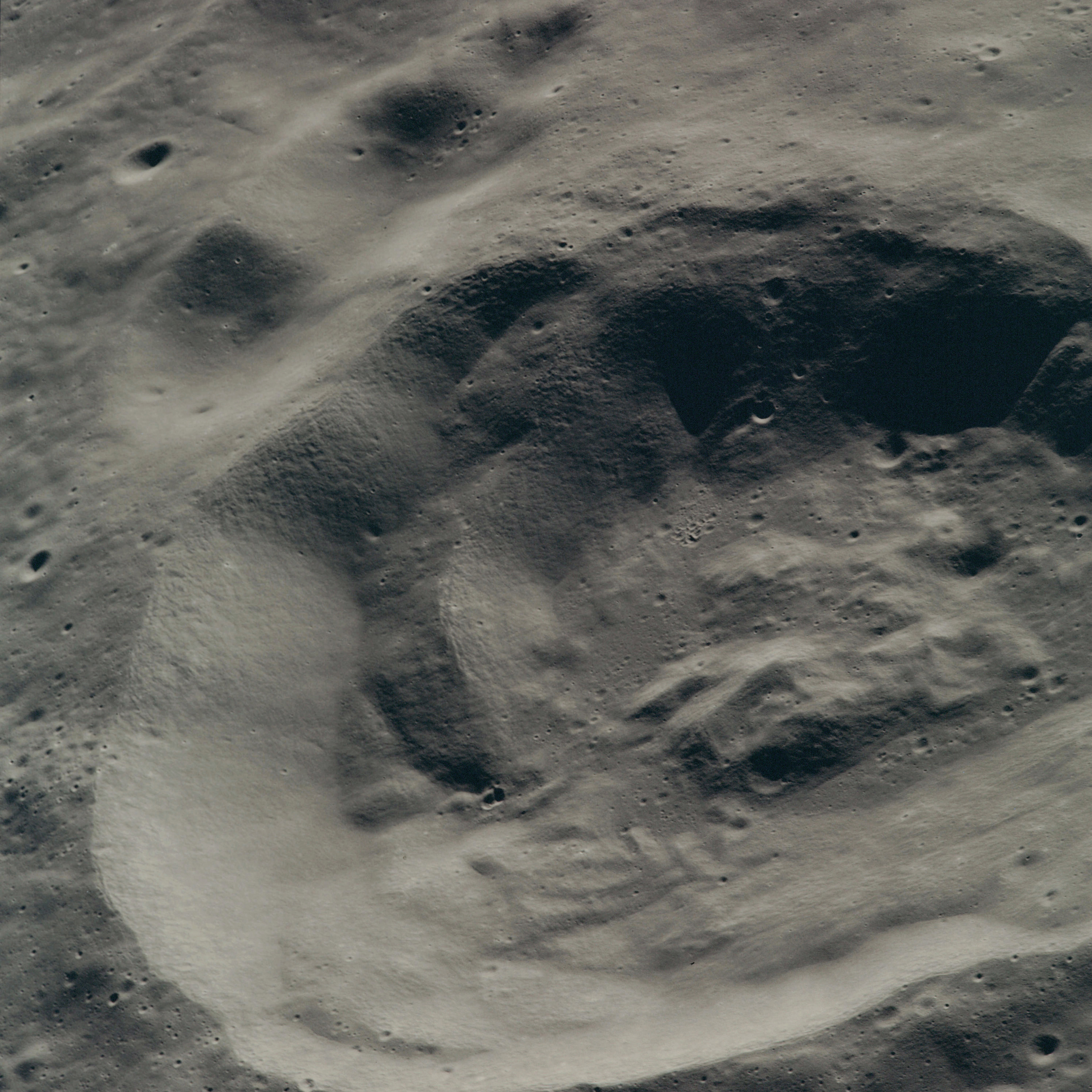
Closeup of Amici T from Apollo 8
