= Herschel wedge =

Optical prism used in solar observation

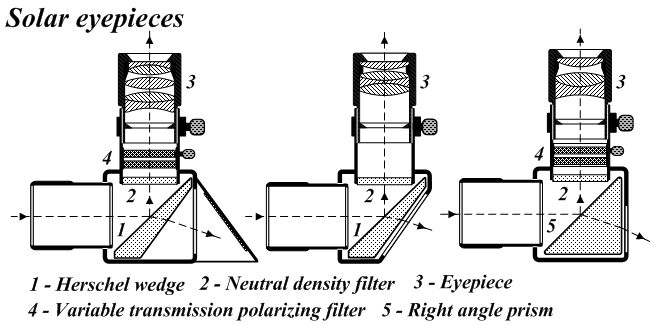
Diagram of a Herschel Wedge and other solar viewing methods.

A Herschel wedge or Herschel prism is an optical prism used in solar observation to refract most of the light out of the optical path, allowing safe visual observation. It was first proposed and used by astronomer John Herschel in the 1830s.

== Overview ==
The prism in a Herschel wedge has a trapezoidal cross section. The surface of the prism facing the light acts as a standard diagonal mirror, reflecting a small portion of the incoming light at 90 degrees into the eyepiece. The trapezoidal prism shape refracts the remainder of the light gathered by the telescope's objective away at an angle. The Herschel wedge reflects about 4.6% of the light that passes through one of the prism faces that is flat to 1/10 of the wavelength of the light. The remaining ~95.4% of the light and heat goes into the prism and exits through the other face and out the back door of the housing; thus, the excess light and heat is disposed of and not used for observing. While they decrease the intensity of the light, they do not affect the visible spectra, resulting in a more accurate spectral profile, which can be filtered to bring out certain details. They are an alternative to white light filters, which, despite their name, inherently must block certain visible spectra.

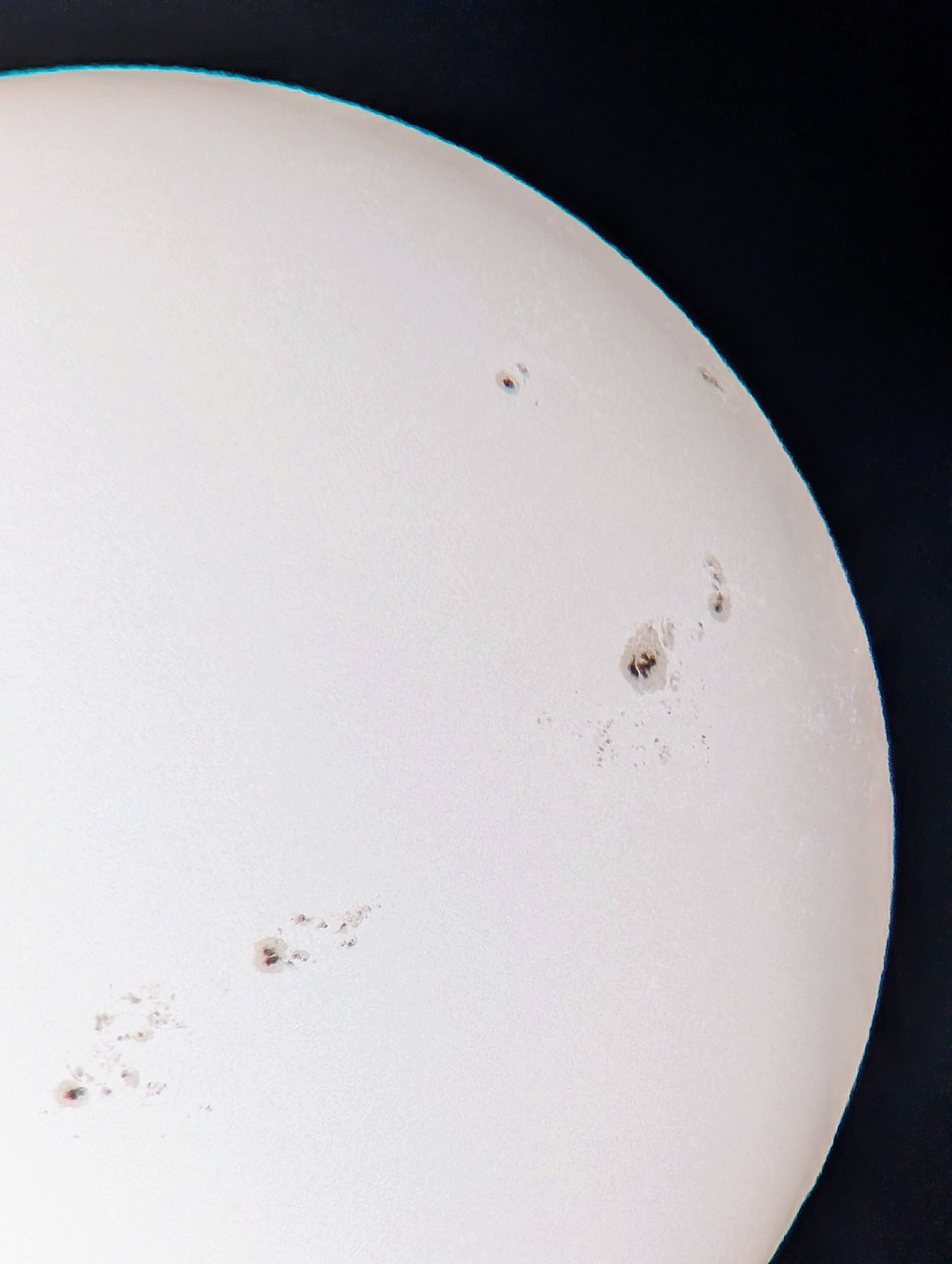
Sunspots viewed through a telescope fitted with a Herschel Wedge.

== Limitations ==
Hershel Wedges present a unique set of hazards and design considerations for the amateur astronomer. Unlike a full aperture ND solar filter, a sub aperture solar filter like a Herschel Wedge allows the full intensity of sunlight to be concentrated by the primary optic.

Secondary optics such as field flatteners, focal reducers, secondary mirrors, and bandpass filters, that are upstream of the Herschel wedge but downstream of the primary optic can overheat and be damaged. Reflectors are extremely dangerous to use with Herschel wedges, since their optical path is poorly contained. While many fear damaging their telescope is the primary reason for avoiding sub-aperture solar filters on reflective telescopes, blinding hazards with reflectors is perhaps even more compelling.

Unlike refractors, whose focal planes lie to the rear of the telescope, reflectors like SCT, Newtonian, RCT, Gregorian, and RASA telescopes have primary mirrors that focus light to a plane in front of the telescope. While some designs use this focal plane as is, others use additional lenses or reflective optics to both correct and move a small portion of this focal plane to a separate area on the telescope. However, it’s important to remember the majority of this focal plane remains in free space, and when it is allowed to focus unfiltered sunlight, like in the case of a Herschel Wedge telescope, it can have disastrous consequences. Looking down the front of a reflecting telescope in direct unfiltered sunlight is no different than staring into the eyepiece of a telescope aimed at the sun without a filter. The large size of reflecting primary mirrors creates the potential for this focal point to burn the inside of a telescope tube or even nearby objects in the vicinity of the telescope.

People who have made a habit of inspecting the inside of their telescope by viewing it from the front or even those who simply want to cap it while its outside may not realize that the same action during the day under sunlight will blind them. Others who use Newtonian telescopes, where a user needs to stand directly above a telescope to enjoy the eyepiece may be burned or blinded by sunlight when slewing on it in the sky.

It is also important to note that even at 4.5%, (~N.D. 1.35) the light from the sun is still strong enough to burn the retina, and so an appropriate neutral density filter must still be used.

== See also ==
- List of telescope parts and construction
