= Good Friday prayer for the Jews =

Annual prayer in some Christian liturgies

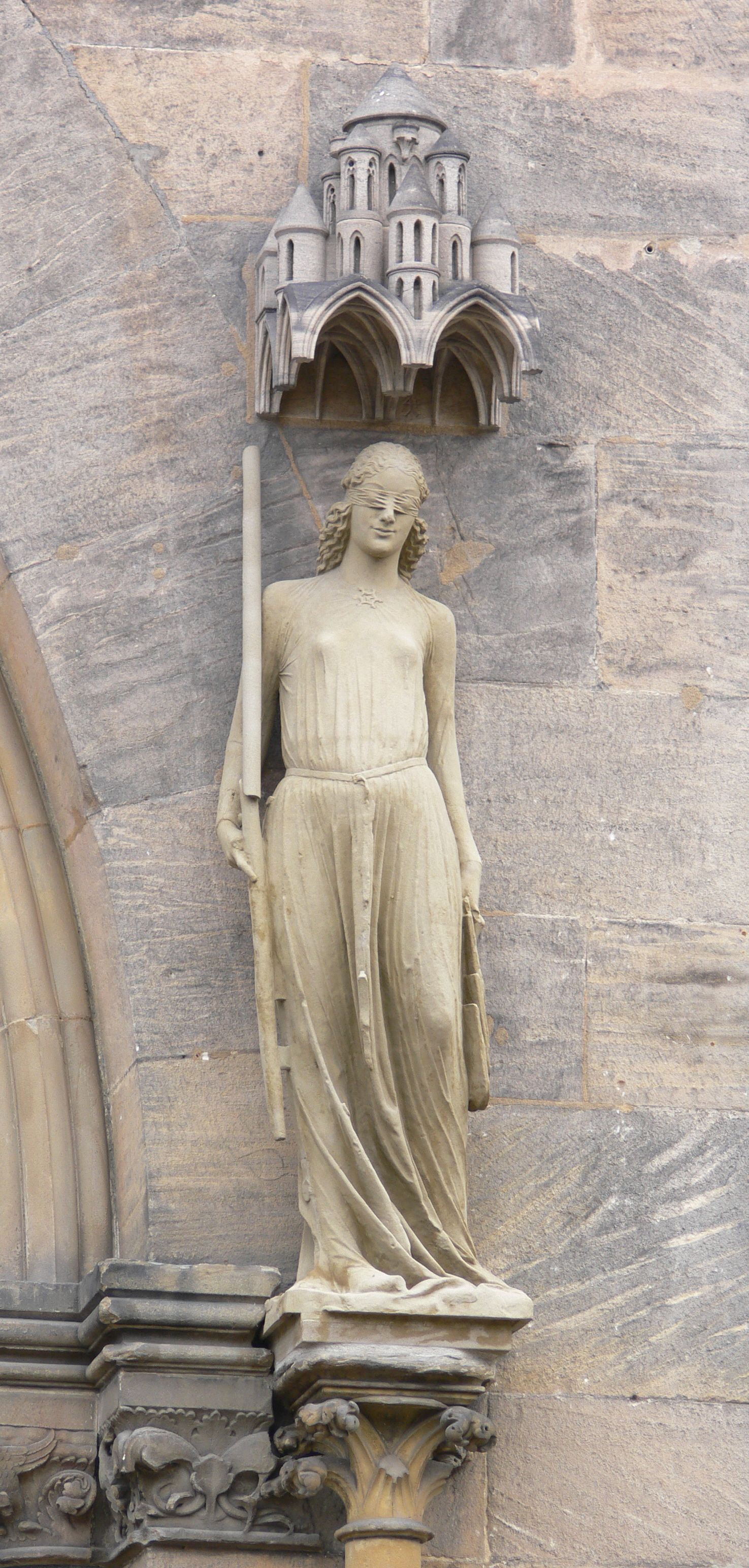
""Synagoga" at Bamberg Cathedral, c.13th century. The sculpture is depicted as a female figure with broken Torah scroll and blindfolded eyes.

The Good Friday prayer for the Jews is an annual prayer in some Christian liturgies. It is one of several petitions, known in the Catholic Church as the Solemn Intercessions, in the Evangelical-Lutheran Churches as the Bidding Prayers, and in the Episcopal Church as the Solemn Collects, that are made in the Good Friday service for various classes and stations of peoples: for the Church; for the pope; for bishops, priests and deacons; for the faithful; for catechumens; for other Christians; for the Jews; for others who do not believe in Christ; for those who do not believe in God; for those in public office; and for those in special need. These prayers are ancient, predating the eighth century at least, as they are found in the Gelasian Sacramentary.

== Western Christianity ==
=== Catholic Church ===
==== Background ====
The original Christians first addressed their missionary sermons to Jews from the Judea region and called on them to repent, to enable them to escape from the expected final judgment (Acts 2:38). The New Testament does not testify to a special prayer for them.

Some early Church Fathers, such as Justin, occasionally counted Jews among the enemies for whom persecuted Christians should pray according to Jesus' commandment of love of enmity (Matthew 5:45) and his own request for forgiveness on the cross (Luke 23:34). This followed the example of Jeremiah, who had called on the Jews exiled in Babylon to pray for the good of the city (Jeremiah 29:7).

Since the rise of Christianity as the Roman state religion from AD 380, the Christian mission among Jews had limited success. Around AD 400, writers such as Jerome and Leo the Great referred to the practice of including Jews in Christian prayers as unbelievers, drawing on Pauline theology that presents them as the root of the Church (Romans 11:18).

Since about AD 500, a special Jewish prayer in the daily Mass has been known. However, this was only included in some measuring orders in Spain since AD 586. The Roman, Milan and Gallican Liturgies of the 6th century prayed for Jews, heretics and pagans only on Good Friday. The Sacramentarium Gregorianum, around the late 6th century, contained such Good Friday prayers. According to the Ambrosian Rite in the 8th century, they were formulated equally for all three groups and demanded that all of them include a genuflection.

Around 800, for the first time in the Salzburg chapters, then in the church mass books among the Carolingians, the interceding for the Jews, the usual invitation to the prayers, otherwise usual in all prayers, was missing. Amalarius justified this around 820 as follows:

"In all prayers we bend the knee, (...) except when we pray 'pro perfidis Judaeis'. For they have bent their knees before Christ, but have turned a good custom into its opposite, since they did this as a mockery."

With this, he wrote the sneering knee fall of Roman soldiers who scourged and tortured Jesus before his crucifixion, mentioned in Matthew 27:29 and Mark 15:19. This justification prevailed throughout the Church, as such, the genuflection in the prayer for the Jews was omitted.

A handwritten marginal note on the sacramentarium of Saint-Vast (10th century), translated in 1924 justified the elimination of the genuflection. It was as follows:

"Here none of us [priests] should bow down because of the fear that the wrath of the Christian people instilled in his priests."

Throughout the Middle Ages, Good Friday and Easter week generally was a time of dread for Jews who often came under attack. The extent to which the language used in the Good Friday prayers contributed to this is a matter of dispute.

==== Tridentine version ====
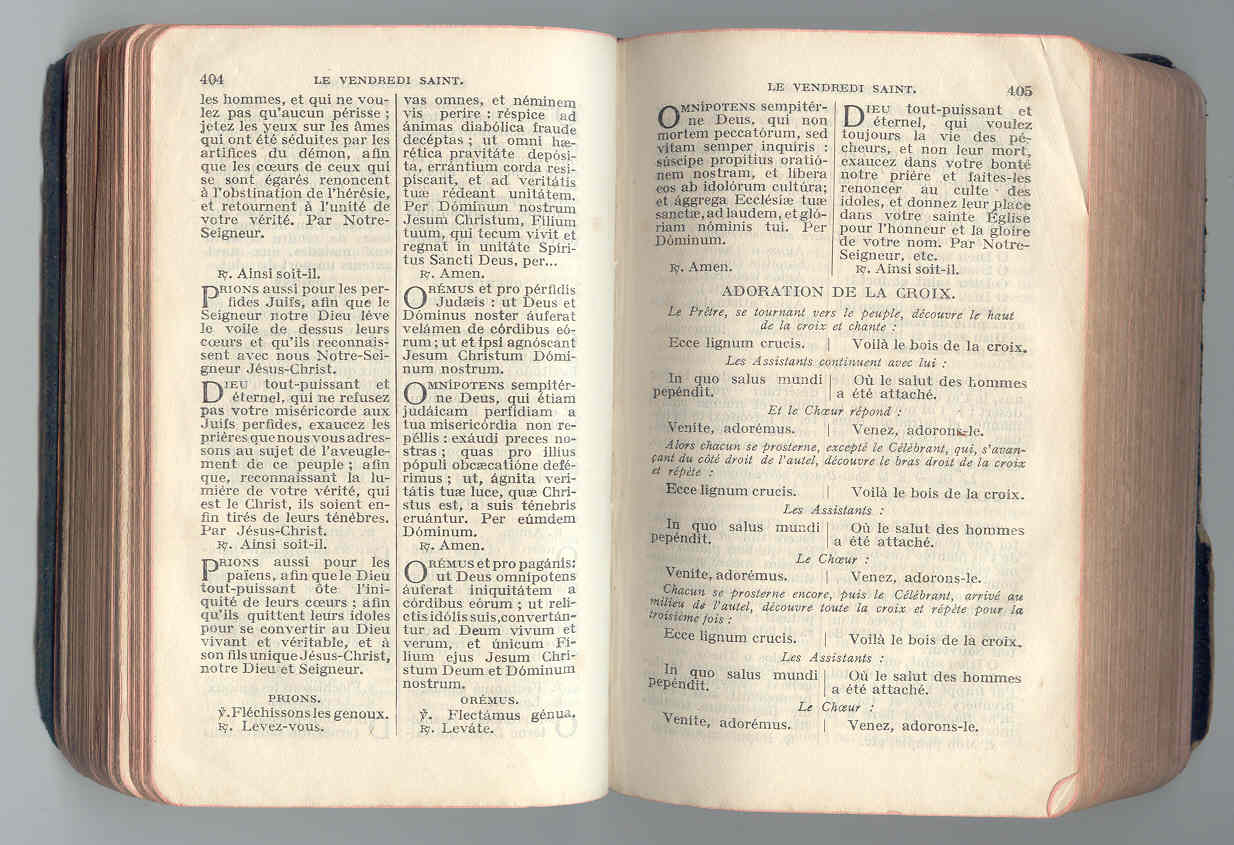
"Orémus et pro pérfidis Judǽis..." in Nouveau Paroissien Romain, 1924

The form used between 1570 and 1955 read as follows:

Let us pray also for the faithless Jews: that Almighty God may remove the veil from their hearts; (Note: The mention of a "veil" is in reference to 2 Corinthians 3:13–16.) so that they too may acknowledge Jesus Christ our Lord. ['Amen' is not responded, nor is said 'Let us pray', or 'Let us kneel', or 'Arise', but immediately is said:] Almighty and eternal God, who dost not exclude from thy mercy even Jewish faithlessness: hear our prayers, which we offer for the blindness of that people; that acknowledging the light of thy Truth, which is Christ, they may be delivered from their darkness. Through the same Jesus Christ our Lord, who liveth and reigneth with thee in the unity of the Holy Spirit, God, for ever and ever. Amen.

Regarding the omission of the genuflection from this prayer, Liturgist Dom Prosper Guéranger, O.S.B., wrote:

The Church has no hesitation in offering up a prayer for the descendants of Jesus' executioners; but in doing so she refrains from genuflecting, because this mark of adoration was turned by the Jews into an insult against our Lord during the Passion.

The Russian-Jewish historian Lurie Solomon, on the other hand, wrote in his 1922 book on antisemitism in antiquity that this explanation was arbitrary and ad hoc invented since according to the gospels, it was the Roman soldiers, not the Jews, who mocked Christ. Lurie quotes Kane who wrote that "all authors tried to justify the practice that had existed before them, not to introduce the new one. Apparently this practice (of not kneeling) had been established as a result of the populist antisemitism." The French historian Pierre Pierrard recalled being struck in his youth by this failure to kneel as a lesson in antisemitism, as the Jews were consigned to a "moral ghetto".

==== First attempt at reform ====
In February 1926, Franziska van Leer, a Dutch Jew convert to Catholicism, had unsuccessfully asked Cardinal Wilhelmus Marinus van Rossum, to work for a change to the Good Friday prayer. On their initiative, the Clerical Association of Friends of Israel, a Catholic cleric organization, was founded to foster positive attitudes toward Jews and to pray for their conversion to Christianity. Based on their belief that Christ is "the first-born, the truth and the head of Israel" and the Jews as the chosen people, they campaigned for reconciliation between Catholicism and Judaism to facilitate the Jewish mission. They, therefore rejected the traditional anti-Judaistic conspiracies of the murder of God, ritual murders and the desecration of hosts and wanted to eliminate anti-Jewish elements in the Catholic liturgy.

In January 1928, abbott Benedetto Gariador submitted a document to Pope Pius XI, which requested the removal or replacement of the expressions perfidis/perfidia and the reinstatement of genuflecting in the prayer for the Jews. The document argued as follows:

- Historically, Christians have prayed very early for the conversion of the Jews to Christ, not for their conversion to Christianity.
- The expression "perfidis" was originally only related to concrete violations of the law of certain Jews, only later understood as "complete corruption" and was thus reinterpreted as the unchangeable character of all Jews.
- The alleged mocking kneeling before Jesus by Jews is not in the New Testament and is rather a fiction added later.
- The prayer is now being abused as an argument for antisemitism, which the Catholic Church itself even propagates in its services.
- As such "perfidiam Judaicam" should be replaced by "plebem Judaicam" (the "Jewish people"), as stated in a manuscript of the Manuale Ambrosianum from the 11th century.

Pope Pius XI had been reportedly in favour of the changes and asked the Sacred Congregation of Rites to review the matter. They commissioned Benedictine abbot Alfredo Ildefonso Schuster, a specialist in the liturgy, to assess these proposals. He spoke out unreservedly for its implementation and described the omission of genuflecting as biblically unjustifiable. The congregation recommended the acceptance of the requested changes and submitted its opinion to the Holy Office for review. They first consulted Dominican friar Marco Sales, considered close to Pius XI. He initially accepted that, from the point of view of faith and doctrine, there was no reason to object to the proposed liturgical reforms. However, in view of the Catholic tradition, they were considered inappropriate and not useful and argued that:

- All the criticized parts of the Jewish prayer, including the omission of the kneeling and the 'Amen', had already appeared in the ancient Church. As "venerable holy liturgy, dating back to antiquity", they escape any reformability.
- If such interference in this tradition were to be allowed to a private association, one would not come to an end and could just as well allow the removal of offensive passages in the apostolic credo, the improvers and the curse psalms from the liturgy. These contained much harsher formulations for Jews.
- "Perfidis" always means a breach of words and contracts: This is exactly what God himself accuses the Jews in the Bible. Sales referred to Deuteronomy 20:27, 31:16, Psalm 78:57, 2 Corinthians 17:15 and Acts 7:5.
- Just as God had only made a covenant with the Jewish people, only those who had broken this covenant and continued it constantly: therefore the expression "perfidis" is appropriate for them, and not for the pagans.
- No one could accuse Pope Pius V, the author of the Missale Romanum, of antisemitism, since he had always stood up for the Jews.
- According to Matthew 27:25, the Jews themselves assumed responsibility for the crucifixion of Christ.

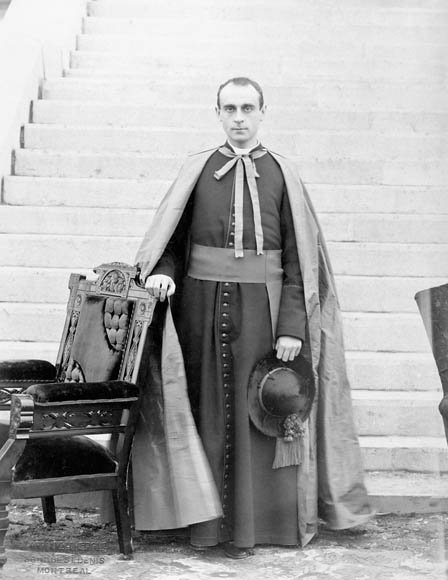
Rafael Merry del Val in 1897

Cardinal Rafael Merry del Val, who had been appointed secretary of the Holy Office as a representative of anti-modernism, was himself a member of the Friends of Israel. At a meeting in February 1928, he was convinced that the association publicly discussed and wanted to reform the Good Friday prayer and promote Zionism. He immediately launched an investigation into Friends of Israel to have it banned. To shorten the procedure, he himself filed the complaint, which was otherwise only admissible from the outside, and demanded a papal decree to circumvent the otherwise required expert opinion and its double examination by consultants and cardinals. With the help of Pius XI, de Val sought to block their goals at reform. He wrote on 7 March 1928:

This report put forward by the so-called Friends of Israel, strikes me as completely unacceptable, indeed even rash. We are dealing with ancient prayers and rites of the liturgy of the Church, a liturgy inspired and consecrated for centuries that includes condemnation of the rebellion and betrayal perpetrated by the chosen people who were at once unfaithful and deicide. ... I would hope that these [Friends of Israel] would not fall into a trap laid by the Jews themselves, who insinuate themselves throughout modern society and seek with whatever means to minimize the memory of their history and take advantage of the good will of Christians.

Pope Pius XI reluctantly accepted these views and the Holy Office dissolved the association on 25 March 1928.

==== Changes by Pius XII ====
After World War II, Eugenio Zolli, the former Chief Rabbi of Rome and a convert to Roman Catholicism, asked Pope Pius XII to excise the adjective perfidis from the prayer for the Jews. Professor Jules Isaac, a French scholar of Catholic-Jewish relations, did so as well in an audience with Pius in 1949. Pius responded with a public declaration that the Latin word perfidus means 'unbelieving', not 'perfidious' or 'treacherous'. Pope John XXIII later made that change official.

As part of his major revision of the Holy Week liturgy in 1955, Pope Pius XII instituted kneeling for this petition as at the other petitions of the litany, so that the prayer read:

Let us pray also for the faithless Jews: that almighty God may remove the veil from their hearts; so that they too may acknowledge Jesus Christ our Lord. Let us pray. Let us kneel. [pause for silent prayer] Arise. Almighty and eternal God, who dost not exclude from thy mercy even Jewish faithlessness: hear our prayers, which we offer for the blindness of that people; that acknowledging the light of thy Truth, which is Christ, they may be delivered from their darkness. Through the same our Lord Jesus Christ, who liveth and reigneth with thee in the unity of the Holy Spirit, God, for ever and ever. Amen.

==== Changes by John XXIII ====
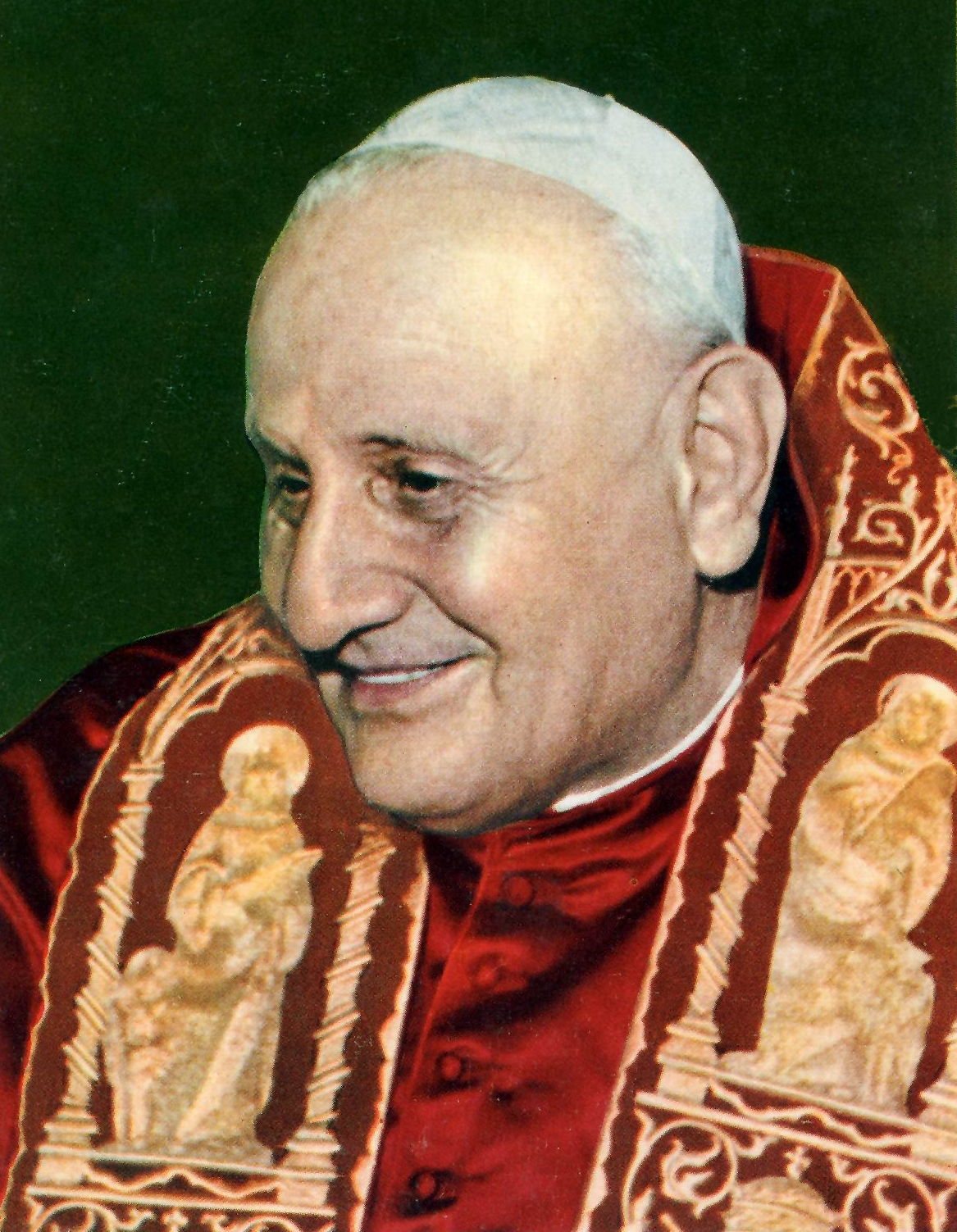
Pope John XXIII

Under Pope John XXIII, new approaches to the prayer for the Jews had emerged. As papal nuncio to Hungary from 1940 to 1944, Roncalli helped tens of thousands of Hungarian, Slovak and Bulgarian Jews persecuted by the Nazis to escape.

Without previously indicating any intention to reform, on 21 March 1959, John XXIII ordered that the word faithless (Latin: perfidis) be removed from the prayer for the conversion of the Jews, which was formalized on 5 July 1959, to take effect across the Church the following year. This word had caused much trouble because of misconceptions that the Latin perfidis was equivalent to perfidious, giving birth to the view that the prayer accused the Jews of treachery (perfidy), though the Latin word is more correctly translated as 'faithless' or 'unbelieving'. (Note: This misunderstanding is based on an inadequate understanding of medieval Latin. In classical Latin, perfidus did have a meaning similar to its present English analogue, derived as it was from the phrase per fidem decipere, 'to deceive through trust.' However, by late antiquity and the early Middle Ages, perfidus and perfidia simply meant the opposite of fides and fidelis. Thus perfidus in medieval Latin is best translated as 'faithless' or 'unbelieving', meaning lacking the Christian faith.) Accordingly, the prayer was revised to read:

Let us pray also for the Jews: that almighty God may remove the veil from their hearts; so that they too may acknowledge Jesus Christ our Lord. Let us pray. Let us kneel. Arise. Almighty and eternal God, who dost also not exclude from thy mercy the Jews: hear our prayers, which we offer for the blindness of that people; that acknowledging the light of thy Truth, which is Christ, they may be delivered from their darkness. Through the same our Lord Jesus Christ, who liveth and reigneth with thee in the unity of the Holy Spirit, God, for ever and ever. Amen.

John XXIII demonstrated his commitment to the change during the Good Friday service in St. Peter's Basilica on Good Friday of 1963. When the canon reciting the eight prayers included the word perfidis when chanting the prayer for the Jews, the seventh prayer, the Pope signaled for the liturgy to stop and then had the sequence of prayers repeated from the beginning with the word omitted.

==== Changes by Paul VI ====
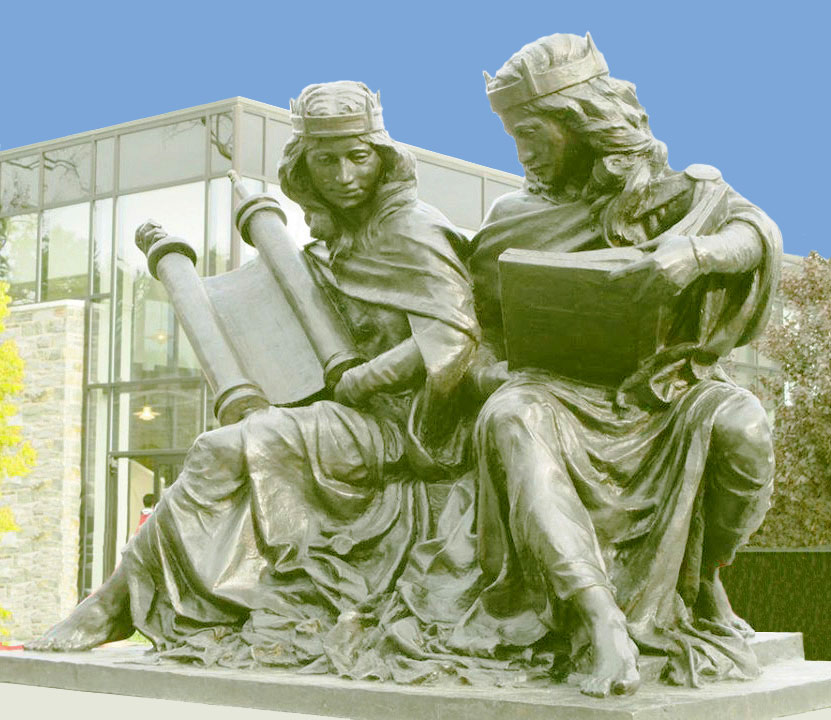
Synagoga and Ecclesia in Our Time, Saint Joseph's University, as of July 2016.

After the Second Vatican Council, the prayer was revised twice: firstly on 7 March 1965. Because of the possibility of a misinterpretation similar to that of the word perfidis, the reference to the veil on the hearts of the Jews, which was based on 2 Corinthians 3:14, was removed. The 1965 prayer is as follows:

Let us pray also for the Jews: that our God and Lord may be pleased to shine the light of his face over them; that they too may acknowledge Jesus Christ our Lord as the Redeemer of all. Let us pray. Let us kneel. Arise. Almighty ever-living God who conferred your promises on Abraham and his seed, mercifully hear the prayers of your Church, that the people whom you anciently acquired may merit to come to the fullness of Redemption. Through Christ our Lord. Amen.

This first modification was very significant, as for the first time, God's covenant with Abraham, the ancestor of all Jews, was recognized for the blessing of all peoples (Genesis 12:3), as a valid basis for Israel's hope of salvation. Thus, the theology of "hard supersessionism" was abandoned and an alternative to it was emphasized. The first sentence is based on the Aaronite Blessing, one of the oldest Jewish prayers that had already been adopted by early Christianity.

The prayer was revised again for the 1970 edition of the Roman Missal, following the approval of the declaration Nostra aetate in October 1965. The 1973 ICEL English translation of the revised prayer, which was to be retained in the rejected 1998 version, is as follows:

Let us pray for the Jewish people, the first to hear the word of God, that they may continue to grow in the love of his name and in faithfulness to his covenant. [Prayer in silence. Then the priest says:] Almighty and eternal God, long ago you gave your promise to Abraham and his posterity. Listen to your Church as we pray that the people you first made your own may arrive at the fullness of redemption. We ask this through Christ our Lord. Amen.

==== Changes by Benedict XVI ====
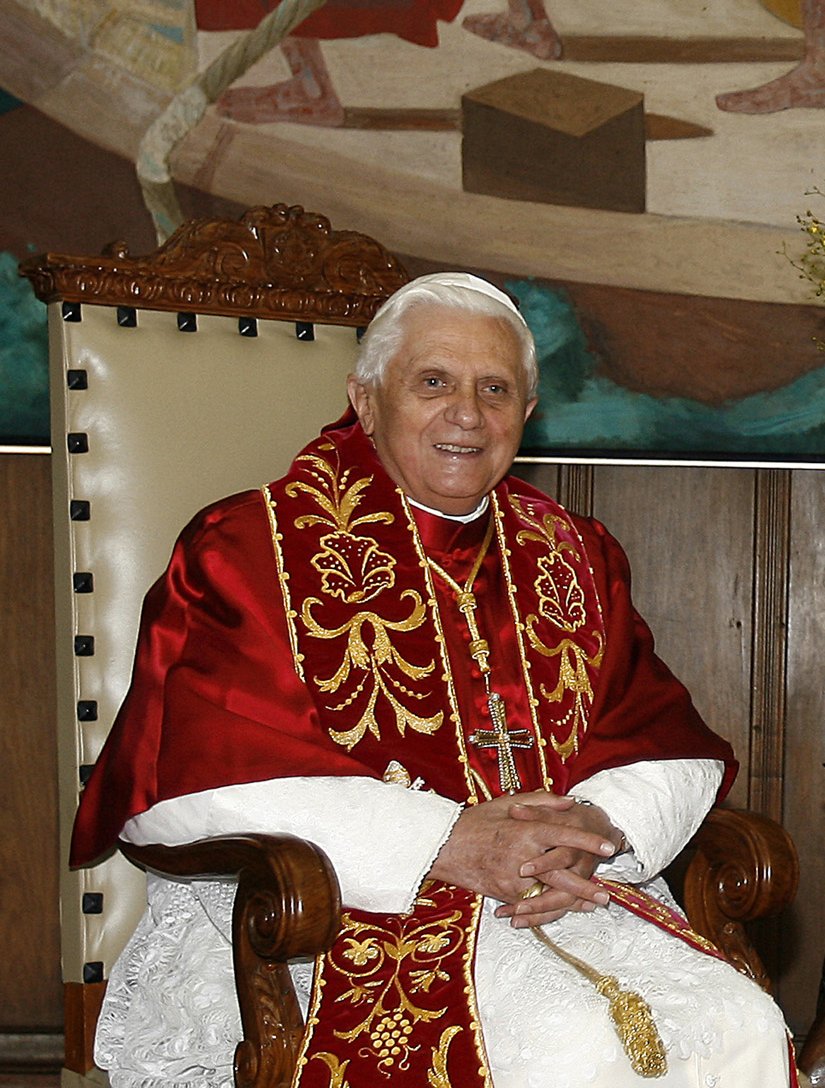
Pope Benedict XVI

On 7 July 2007, the Vatican released Pope Benedict XVI's motu proprio entitled, Summorum Pontificum which permitted more widespread celebration of Mass according to the "Missal promulgated by Pope John XXIII in 1962". The universal permission given to priests by Pope Benedict XVI in 2007 to use the 1962 Roman Missal both privately and, under certain conditions, with a congregation was followed by protests from Jewish groups and some Catholic leaders over what they perceived as a return to a supersessionist theology that they saw expressed in the 1960 prayer. In response to these protests, on 5 February 2008, Pope Benedict XVI issued an amended Good Friday prayer for the 1962 Missal. On 6 February 2008, the Vatican newspaper, L'Osservatore Romano, published a note of the Secretariat of State announcing that Pope Benedict XVI had amended the Good Friday prayer for the Jews contained in the 1962 Roman Missal, and decreeing that the amended text "be used, beginning from the current year, in all celebrations of the Liturgy of Good Friday according to the aforementioned Missale Romanum".

The new prayer reads as follows:

Let us also pray for the Jews: That our God and Lord may illuminate their hearts, that they acknowledge Jesus Christ is the Savior of all men. (Let us pray. Kneel. Rise.) Almighty and eternal God, who want that all men be saved and come to the recognition of the truth, propitiously grant that even as the fullness of the peoples enters Thy Church, all Israel be saved. Through Christ Our Lord. Amen.

Even the new formulation met with reservations from groups such as the Anti-Defamation League. They considered the removal of blindness and immersion in darkness with respect to the Jews an improvement over the original language in the Tridentine Mass, but saw no reason why the prayer in the rite as revised by Paul VI was not used instead.

==== Renewed debate ====
Jewish reactions to Benedict's authorization underlined their concern that the traditional formulation, which Jews felt offensive, would be more broadly used.

In the form in which they appear in the 1962 Missal, the set of prayers in which that of the Jews is included are for: the Holy Church, the Supreme Pontiff; all orders and grades of the faithful (clergy and laity); public officials (added in 1955, replacing an older prayer for the Holy Roman Emperor, not used since the abdication of Francis II in 1806 but still printed in the Roman Missal); catechumens; the needs of the faithful; heretics and schismatics; the conversion of the Jews (without the word perfidis); the conversion of pagans.

In later editions of the Missal, the prayers are for: the Church; the Pope, the clergy and laity of the Church; those preparing for baptism; the unity of Christians, the Jewish people; those who do not believe in Christ; those who do not believe in God; all in public office; those in special need.

The Anti-Defamation League (ADL) complained about the document because the 1962 text for Good Friday includes the request asking God to "lift the veil" from Jewish hearts and to show mercy "to the Jews also." Abraham Foxman, the then director of the ADL responded to the liberalization of the Tridentine Mass by saying

We are extremely disappointed and deeply offended that nearly 40 years after the Vatican rightly removed insulting anti-Jewish language from the Good Friday mass, it would now permit Catholics to utter such hurtful and insulting words by praying for Jews to be converted. It is the wrong decision at the wrong time. It appears the Vatican has chosen to satisfy a right-wing faction in the church that rejects change and reconciliation.

Monsignor Dennis Mikulanis, vicar for inter-religious and ecumenical affairs for the Roman Catholic diocese of San Diego, responded to the ADL saying that "the Church has not restored antisemitic language." Mikulanis said that the ADL jumped the gun by issuing a statement before the official document had been released and not understanding it. Mikulanis stated that the previous "antisemitic wording from the liturgy" had already been removed from this missal. A letter from the Vatican stated, "Several media reports erroneously contend that the letter could in effect reinstate a prayer offensive to Jews from the Good Friday liturgy of the Tridentine Mass, which dates back to 1570." The Latin Mass before 1959 contained a reference to "the Jews, who do not have the Faith", which was deleted in 1959 and does not appear in the missal being permitted by Summorum Pontificum.

After having some time to study Summorum Pontificum and its implications for the Jewish point of view, Abraham Foxman, the National Director of the ADL, reiterated its previously stated position. Foxman wrote, "The wider use of the Latin Mass will make it more difficult to implement the doctrines of Vatican II and Pope John Paul II, and could even set in motion retrograde forces within the church on the subject of the Jews, none of which are in the interest of either the church or the Jewish people." He goes on to reiterate that the problem lies with a prayer that calls for the conversion of the Jews that "was removed by Paul VI in 1970".

At the same time, Foxman emphasized that "the Vatican is not an enemy of the Jewish people, nor is Pope Benedict XVI." Rather, he wrote, "the current controversy speaks to the need for direct and honest communication based on the friendly relations that have evolved. The church must be true to itself and its teachings, and it must understand that reintroducing this prayer – it was removed by Paul VI in 1970 and replaced with a positive one recognizing the Jews' eternal covenant with God – will play into the hands of those who are against better relations between Jews and Catholics."

Although the 1962 version does not include the phrase deemed most offensive (Orémus et pro pérfidis Judǽis), it is still criticized by some as a prayer that explicitly asks for the conversion of Jews to the Catholic faith of Christ.

Cardinal Avery Dulles responded that the church has a "God-given responsibility to proclaim Christ to all the world. Peter on Pentecost Sunday declared that the whole house of Israel should know for certain that Jesus is Lord and Messiah and that every one of his hearers should be baptized in Jesus' name (Acts 2:38). Paul spent much of his ministry proclaiming the gospel to Jews throughout the diaspora. Distressed by their incredulity, he was prepared to wish himself accursed for the sake of their conversion (Rom 9:3)."

The tradition of praying for various groups and purposes dates back to the Early Church (1 Timothy 2:1–5). Roman Catholics believe that on Good Friday in particular, they must acknowledge their common fallen nature, and that Jesus died for all (1 John 2:2). Catholics have long prayed for many classes of people, both inside and outside the church: for the church as a whole, for the Pope, for the hierarchy and the people (regular and lay), for the Emperor, for catechumens, for various needs, for heretics, for schismatics, for the Jews, and for pagans, wishing that all be called to conversion in Christ.

Given that, according to the rubrics of both the 1962 and the 1970 Missals, there can be only one celebration of the Good Friday liturgy in each church, the ordinary form of the Roman Rite (i.e. the post-1970 form, which omits the images of the veil and of blindness) is the one to be used almost everywhere.

Some have argued that the Good Friday prayers are liturgically similar to the Jewish prayers Birkat haMinim or the Aleinu or the Hagaddah, although this is controversial.

The American Jewish Committee (AJC), on the other hand, expressed "its appreciation to Pope Benedict XVI for his confirmation that the positive changes of Vatican II will apply to his recent decision regarding the Latin Mass, which has been reinstated by the Church". Rabbi David Rosen, the AJC's international director of Interreligious Affairs stated: "We acknowledge that the Church's liturgy is an internal Catholic matter and this motu proprio from Pope Benedict XVI is based on the permission given by John Paul II in 1988 and thus, on principle, is nothing new". The statement by the committee, after acknowledging the said quote from its president, affirmed: "However we are naturally concerned about how wider use of this Tridentine liturgy may impact upon how Jews are perceived and treated. Pope Benedict XVI, in a decree issued on Saturday, authorized wider use of the traditional Latin Mass, which in some liturgy contains language offensive to Jews. We appreciate that the motu proprio actually limits the use of the Latin Mass in the days prior to Easter, which addresses the reference in the Good Friday liturgy concerning the Jews [...] However, it is still not clear that this qualification applies to all situations and we have called on the Vatican to contradict the negative implications that some in the Jewish community and beyond have drawn concerning the motu proprio." (Note: Technically, Mass is not celebrated on Good Friday. The Roman Catholic Good Friday service can more properly called a liturgy (see Good Friday).)

Among traditionalist Catholics, there were mixed reactions to the revised prayer for the Jews issued by Benedict XVI. The Priestly Fraternity of St Peter, defended the prayer that called for the conversion of Jews, insisting that both versions of the Good Friday prayer in the traditional form are "based on a solid biblical, more precisely: on a Pauline foundation" The Society of Saint Pius X, a canonically irregular group whose bishops excommunications were lifted the following year in 2009, described the revised prayer as a "superfluous and regrettable concession to representatives of Judaism."

In the May/June 2007 issue of its newsletter, the Committee on the Liturgy of the United States Conference of Catholic Bishops (USCCB) published an unofficial English translation of Summorum Pontificum and its cover letter, together with commentary in the form of footnotes and 20 questions and answers. Answer 14 addresses the question of antisemitism:

14. Does the wider use of the extraordinary form of the rites of Holy Week reflect a change in the Church's teaching on anti-Semitism? No. The 1962 Missale Romanum already reflected Blessed John XXIII's revision of liturgical language often construed as anti-Semitic. In 1965, the watershed statement Nostra aetate of the Second Vatican Council then repudiated all forms of anti-Semitism as having no place within Christian life. When Pope Paul VI issued the Missale Romanum of 1969, the only prayer for the Jewish people in the Roman liturgy was completely revised for Good Friday to reflect a renewed understanding of the Jews as God's chosen people, "first to hear the word of God."

Throughout his papacy, John Paul II worked to reconcile the Church with the Jewish people and to strengthen new bonds of friendship. In 1988, Pope John Paul II gave permission for the Mass to be celebrated according to the Missale Romanum of 1962 only as a pastoral provision to assist Catholics who remained attached to the previous rites, thereby hoping to develop closer bonds with the family of the Church.

In 2007 Pope Benedict XVI extended such permission for wider pastoral application, but he remained committed to "the need to overcome past prejudices, misunderstandings, indifference and the language of contempt and hostility [and to continue] the Jewish-Christian dialogue…to enrich and deepen the bonds of friendship which have developed".

==== 2011 prayer (Ordinary Form) ====
As part of the ICEL English translation of the third edition of the Roman Missal, the 1970 prayer was retranslated as follows:

Let us pray also for the Jewish people, to whom the Lord our God spoke first, that he may grant them to advance in love of his name and in faithfulness to his covenant. [Prayer in silence. Then the priest says:] Almighty ever-living God, who bestowed your promises on Abraham and his descendants, hear graciously the prayers of your Church, that the people you first made your own may attain the fullness of redemption. Through Christ our Lord. Amen.

Since 2011, this version of the prayer is the only English version authorized for use in the ordinary form of the Roman Rite.

=== Evangelical-Lutheran Churches ===
In the Evangelical-Lutheran Churches, the Bidding Prayers include a Good Friday prayer for the Jews. The Lutheran Missal prescribes that the Bidding Prayers be read from the Epistle side of the altar. The Lutheran Church – Missouri Synod notes that "it is fitting to observe the ancient practice of both kneeling and standing."

In the Lutheran Church of Australia, the Bidding Prayers include the following form:

For the Jewish people

Let us pray for the Jewish people, to whom God spoke through the prophets, that they will acknowledge Jesus as the Christ foretold by the prophets.
(silent prayer)
Almighty Father, long ago you gave your promise to Abraham and his descendants. Grant that your chosen people may share with us the fullness of your redemption.
Lord, in your mercy,

hear our prayer.

=== Anglican Communion ===
The third of the Solemn Collects in the 1662 Book of Common Prayer of the Church of England is as follows:

O merciful God, who hast made all men, and hatest nothing that thou hast made, nor wouldest the death of any sinner, but rather that he be converted and live; Have mercy upon all Jews, Turks, Infidels, and Heretics, and take from them all ignorance, hardness of heart, and contempt of thy Word; and so fetch them home, blessed Lord, to thy flock, that they may be saved among the remnant of the true Israelites, and be made one fold under one shepherd, Jesus Christ our Lord, who liveth and reigneth with thee and the Holy Spirit, one God, world without end. Amen.

Canon XIV of the Anglican Church of Canada provides for the deletion of this collect in the Canadian prayerbook.

Within the US-based Episcopal Church, the 1928 revision of the Book of Common Prayer, replaced "all Jews, Turks, Infidels, and Heretics", with "all who know thee not as thou art revealed in the Gospel of thy Son."

The 1979 edition, reflected the liturgical reform movement of the 20th century, and included, among other things, a clear revision of the entire Good Friday liturgy. The actual Collect prayer was greatly shortened, but after the sermon, a more extensive prayer series (The Solemn Collects) was introduced. As in 1928, these ask for all those who have not yet recognized Christ. The prayer is as follows:

Merciful God, creator of all the peoples of the earth and lover of souls: Have compassion on all who do not know you as you are revealed in your Son Jesus Christ; let your Gospel be preached with grace and power to those who have not heard it; turn the hearts of those who resist it; and bring home to your fold those who have gone astray; that there may be one flock under one shepherd, Jesus Christ our Lord.

The Anglican Church in North America's Book of Common Prayer published in 2019 includes a prayer that God have mercy on the Jewish people and that they accept Christ as their Messiah.

== Eastern Christianity ==
=== Eastern Orthodox Churches ===
In 2007, a group of twelve Eastern Orthodox priests representing five different national churches, some in open defiance of directives from their church leadership, issued a ten-page declaration calling for the removal all liturgical passages they considered antisemitic.

== See also ==
- Antisemitism in Christianity
- Christianity and Judaism
- Christian–Jewish reconciliation
- Conversion of the Jews (future event)
- Improperia
- Birkat haMinim
