= Amici roof prism =

Non-dispersive prism in astronomy

An Amici roof prism

An Amici roof prism, named for its inventor, the Italian astronomer Giovanni Battista Amici, is a type of reflecting prism used to deviate a beam of light by 90° while simultaneously inverting the image. It is commonly used in the eyepieces of telescopes as an image erecting system. It is sometimes called an Amici prism or right angle roof prism. The non-dispersive Amici roof prism should not be confused with the dispersive Amici prism.

The device is shaped like a standard right-angled prism with an additional "roof" section (consisting of two faces meeting at a 90° angle) on the longest side. Total internal reflection from the roof section flips the image laterally. The handedness of the image is unchanged.

The roof faces of the prism are sometimes coated to provide mirror surfaces. This allows the prism to be constructed with other beam deviate angles besides 90° without being limited by total internal reflection.

== See also ==
- Dove prism, a similar type of reflective prism
- Star diagonal
