= Opus sacerdotale Amici Israel =

Roman Catholic organization, 1926–1928

The Opus sacerdotale Amici Israel or the Clerical Association of Friends of Israel, was a short-lived international organization of Roman Catholic priests founded in Rome in February 1926. Its purpose was to pray for the conversion of the Jews and to promote a favorable attitude towards them within the Roman Catholic Church. By the end of the year, its membership included 18 cardinals, 200 bishops and about 2,000 priests. When the association was dissolved by the Holy Office on 28 March 1928, its membership included 19 cardinals, more than 300 bishops and archbishops and about 3,000 priests.

Its ideas were outlined in leaflets written in Latin and circulated among the clergy.

Its first request to the Church was that the word "perfidis", which described the Jews during the Good Friday Prayer for the Jews, be removed, since some believed the prayer could be interpreted as antisemitic. Pope Pius XI asked the Congregation of Rites to consider the proposed reform. Alfredo Ildefonso Schuster, a member of the Amici Israel and a liturgist who was then a Benedictine abbot and soon to become Cardinal Archbishop of Milan, was appointed to monitor this issue. The Congregation of Rites authorized the proposed change but the Holy Office withheld its consent. On 7 March 1928 its head, Cardinal Rafael Merry del Val, himself a member of the Friends, objected:

This report put forward by the so-called Amici Israel strikes me as completely unacceptable, indeed even rash. We are dealing with ancient prayers and rites of the liturgy of the Church, a liturgy inspired and consecrated for centuries that includes condemnation of the rebellion and betrayal perpetrated by the chosen people who were at once unfaithful and deicide. ... I would hope that these Amici Israel would not fall into a trap laid by the Jews themselves, who insinuate themselves throughout modern society and seek with whatever means to minimize the memory of their history and take advantage of the good will of Christians.

Pius reluctantly accepted this view the next day. He advised that the announcement that the Amici was being dissolved be handled with great care.

The decree from the Holy Office that announced the suppression of the association upheld the traditional Catholic belief that Christianity had superseded Judaism (supersessionism), asserted the need to pray for the conversion of the Jews, and firmly condemned racist antisemitism:

The Catholic Church has always prayed for the Jewish people–who until the coming of Jesus Christ were the depository of the divine promises–in spite of or even more because of the continual blindness of that people. With such charity has the Apostolic See protected this same people against unjust vexations! Because it reproves all hatreds and animosities between peoples, it condemns without reservation hatred against the people once chosen by God, a hatred that today is commonly called 'anti-Semitism'.

This was the Holy See's first authoritative statement condemning antisemitism.

== See also ==
- Anti-Judaism
- Good Friday prayer for the Jews
- Nostra aetate
- Pope Pius XI and Judaism
