= Giovanni Battista Amici =

Italian astronomer, microscopist and botanist (1786–1863)

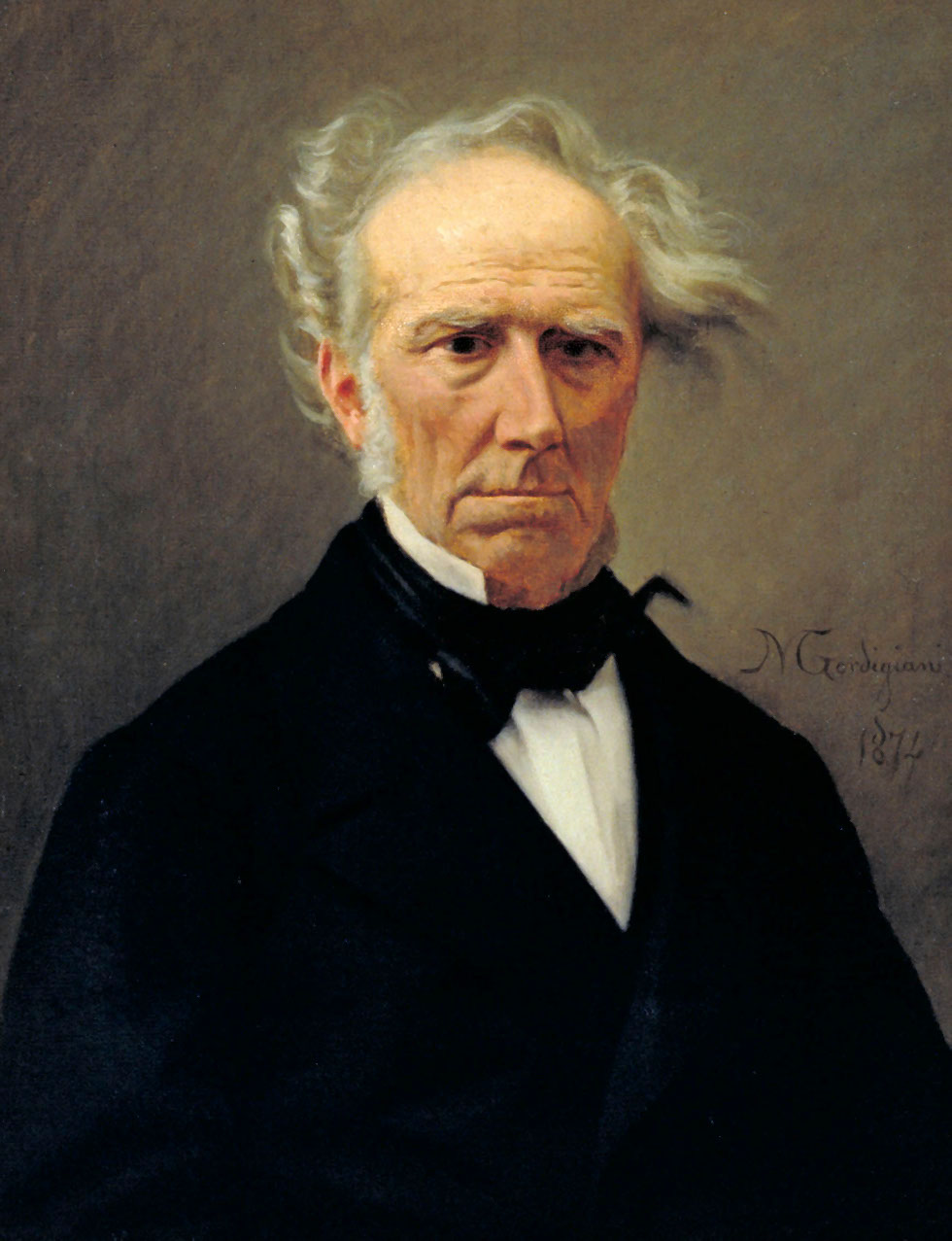
- Portrait of Amici by Michele Gordigiani
- Born: 25 March 1786; Modena, Duchy of Modena and Reggio
- Died: 10 April 1863 (aged 77); Florence, Kingdom of Italy
- Education: University of Bologna
- Occupations: Astronomer, microscopist, botanist
- Employer: La Specola
- Known for: Amici prism Amici roof prism

Signature
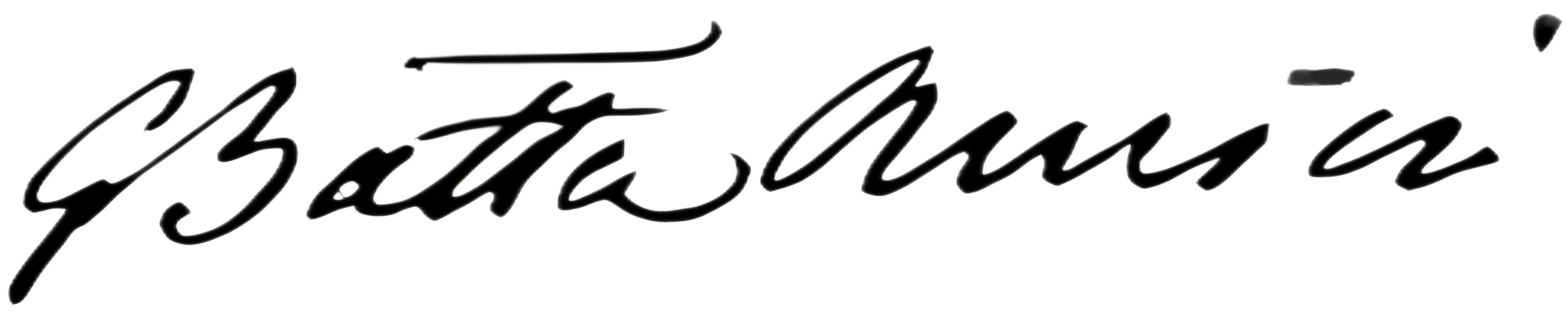

Giovanni Battista Amici (Italian: [dʒoˈvanni batˈtista aˈmiːtʃi]; 25 March 1786 – 10 April 1863) was an Italian astronomer, microscopist, and botanist. He developed an achromatic lens, made use of oil-immersion and water-immersion objectives, and made observations on the movement of plant sap and the growth of pollen.

== Biography ==
Amici was born in Modena, in present-day Italy. He studied mathematics in his hometown under Paolo Ruffini. After graduating from the University of Bologna, he became professor of mathematics at Modena (1815–1825), and in 1831 was appointed inspector-general of studies in the Duchy of Modena. A few years later, he succeeded Jean-Louis Pons as director of the observatory at Florence, where he also lectured at the museum of natural history.

His name is best known for the improvements he effected in the mirrors of reflecting telescopes and especially in the construction of the microscope. He invented the dipleidoscope and also the direct vision prism. The Amici prism, made of three prisms used in spectroscopy, and the Amici-Bertrand lens are named after him.

He also explored astronomical subjects, such as the double stars, the satellites of Jupiter and the measurement of the polar and equatorial diameters of the sun. His interest in biological studies focused on the circulation of the sap in plants, the fructification of plants, infusoria etc. He was the first to observe the pollen tube.

Amici died in Florence on 10 April 1863. The crater Amici on the Moon and the asteroid 3809 Amici are named in his honour. The National Edition of the works and correspondence of Amici was formally established by a Ministerial Decree on February 7, 2003. The project was initiated under the auspices of the Biblioteca Estense of Modena and the Scuola Normale Superiore of Pisa. The planned edition consists of six volumes, covering published works, unpublished documents, correspondence, and a photographic catalog of his instruments. The first two volumes (Opere edite), focusing on Memoirs, Communications, and Scientific Letters, were published in 2006.

== Standard author abbreviation ==
The standard author abbreviation Amici is used to indicate this person as the author when citing a botanical name.

== See also ==
- Amici prism
- Amici roof prism
- Petrographic microscope

== Bibliography ==
- Abetti, Giorgio (1960). "AMICI, Giovanni Battista". Dizionario Biografico degli Italiani (in Italian). Vol. 2: Albicante–Ammannati. Rome: Istituto dell'Enciclopedia Italiana. OCLC 883370.
- Ronchi, Vasco (1970). "Amici, Giovan Battista". Dictionary of Scientific Biography. Vol. 1. New York: Charles Scribner's Sons. pp. 135–137. ISBN 0-684-10114-9. (Note: this source gives Amici's date of death as 1868).
