= Amici prism =

Dispersive prism in spectroscopy

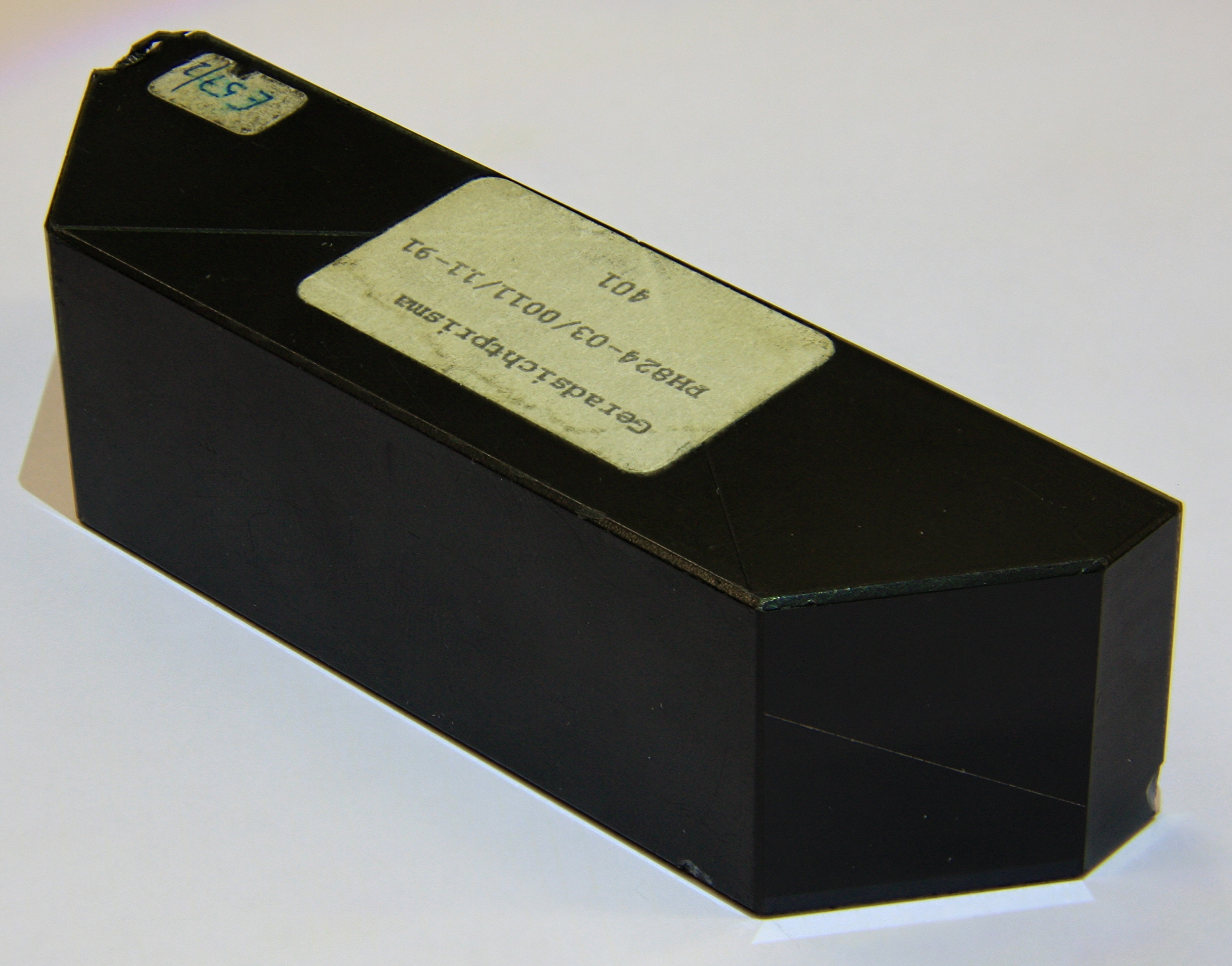
An Amici prism

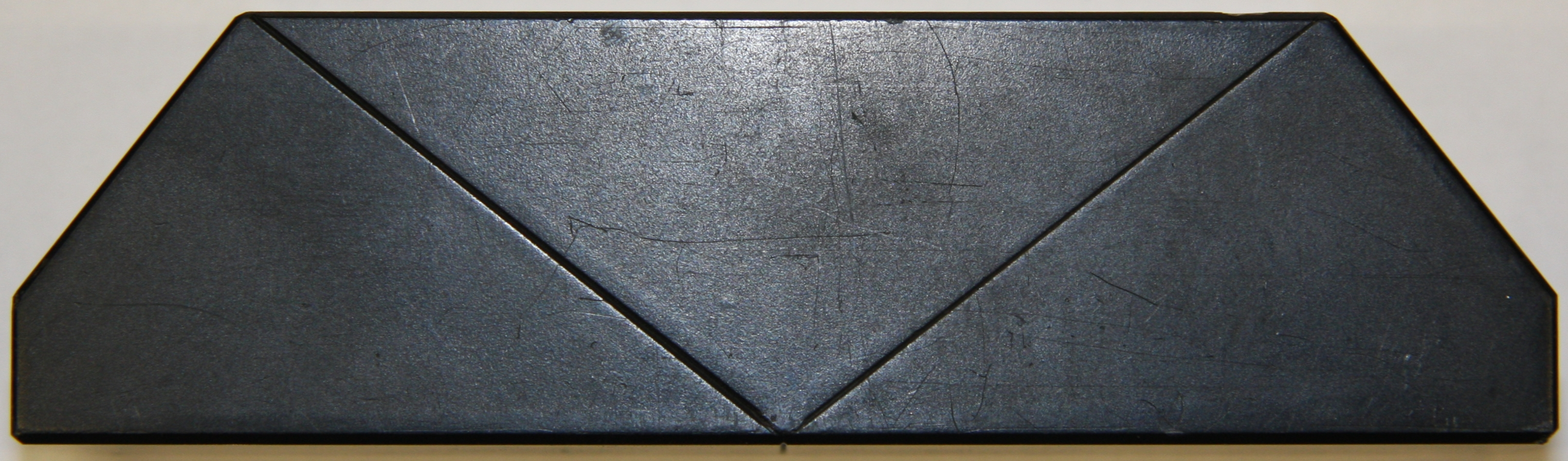
Prism segmentation of a double Amici prism

An Amici prism, with a graphical ray tracing method

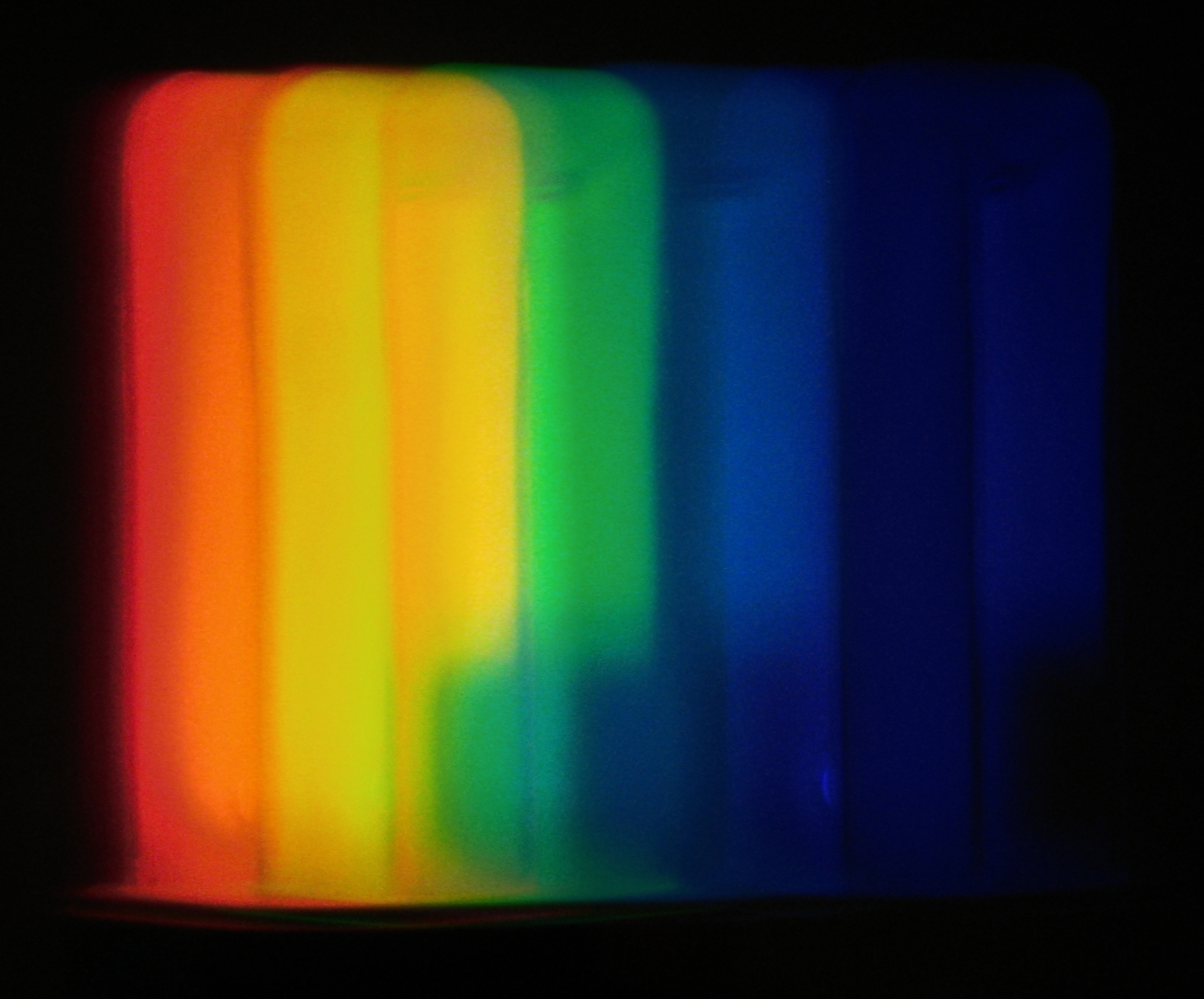
A compact fluorescent lamp seen through an Amici prism

An Amici prism, named for the astronomer Giovanni Battista Amici, is a type of compound dispersive prism used in spectrometers. The Amici prism consists of two triangular prisms in contact, with the first typically being made from a medium-dispersion crown glass, and the second from a higher-dispersion flint glass. Light entering the first prism is refracted at the first air–glass interface, refracted again at the interface between the two prisms, and then exits the second prism at near-normal incidence. The prism angles and materials are chosen such that one wavelength (colour) of light, the centre wavelength, exits the prism parallel to (but offset from) the entrance beam. The prism assembly is thus a direct-vision prism and is commonly used as such in hand-held spectroscopes. Other wavelengths are deflected at angles depending on the glass dispersion of the materials. Looking at a light source through the prism thus shows the optical spectrum of the source.

By 1860, Amici realized that one can join this type of prism back-to-back with a reflected copy of itself, producing a three-prism arrangement known as a double Amici prism. This doubling of the original prism increases the angular dispersion of the assembly and also has the useful property that the centre wavelength is refracted back into the direct line of the entrance beam. The exiting ray of the center wavelength is thus not only undeviated from the incident ray, but also experiences no translation (i.e. transverse displacement or offset) away from the incident ray's path.

Amici himself never published about his nondeviating prism, but rather communicated the idea to his friend Donati, who constructed the device for observations of stellar spectra. Donati's publications of his observations (in 1862) were the first disclosure of the prism doubling idea, and because the prism was practical to build and much more compact than multiple-prism arrangements typical in that period for producing high spectral dispersion, Amici's invention quickly caught the attention of researchers throughout Europe. The dispersion of Amici prisms can be accurately calculated using the multiple-prism dispersion theory assuming no spatial separation between the prism components.

The dispersive Amici prism should not be confused with the non-dispersive Amici roof prism.
