= Solemn Collects =

Set of prayers of the Episcopal Church (USA)

The Solemn Collects are a set of prayers of two types (biddings and collects) used in the Good Friday liturgy of the Episcopal Church (USA), which is published in the 1979 Book of Common Prayer. They are among the most ancient prayers of the Christian church.

== Form ==
The Solemn Collects are divided into five sections that address the five major areas of life that intercessory prayer is designed to address: prayers are said seeking God's aid for the Christian church, for all the nations of the world, for those sick and in need, for any not yet reached by the missionary efforts of the Church, and for the people who are praying, that they may act holily and live eternally.

Each section begins with a bidding sung or spoken by a deacon, which invites the congregation to pray silently for a particular set of concerns. A period of silence follows. The celebrant then sings or says a collect which concludes those prayers, after which the deacon gives the next bidding.

Traditionally, the congregation stands for each bidding, kneels for silent prayer, and then stands for the collect.

== History ==
The exact date of the writing of the Solemn Collects is uncertain: dates as early as the 2nd century AD and as late as the 5th century AD appear in various sources. Some sources suggest that the biddings were written 100–200 years prior to the collects that accompany them. The Solemn Collects appear in the Gelasian Sacramentary and the Gregorian Sacramentary, which mean that they must have entered their modern form by the 8th century.
