= Mirror =

Object that reflects an image

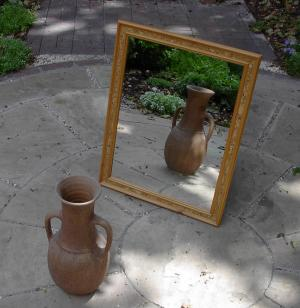
A mirror reflecting the image of a vase

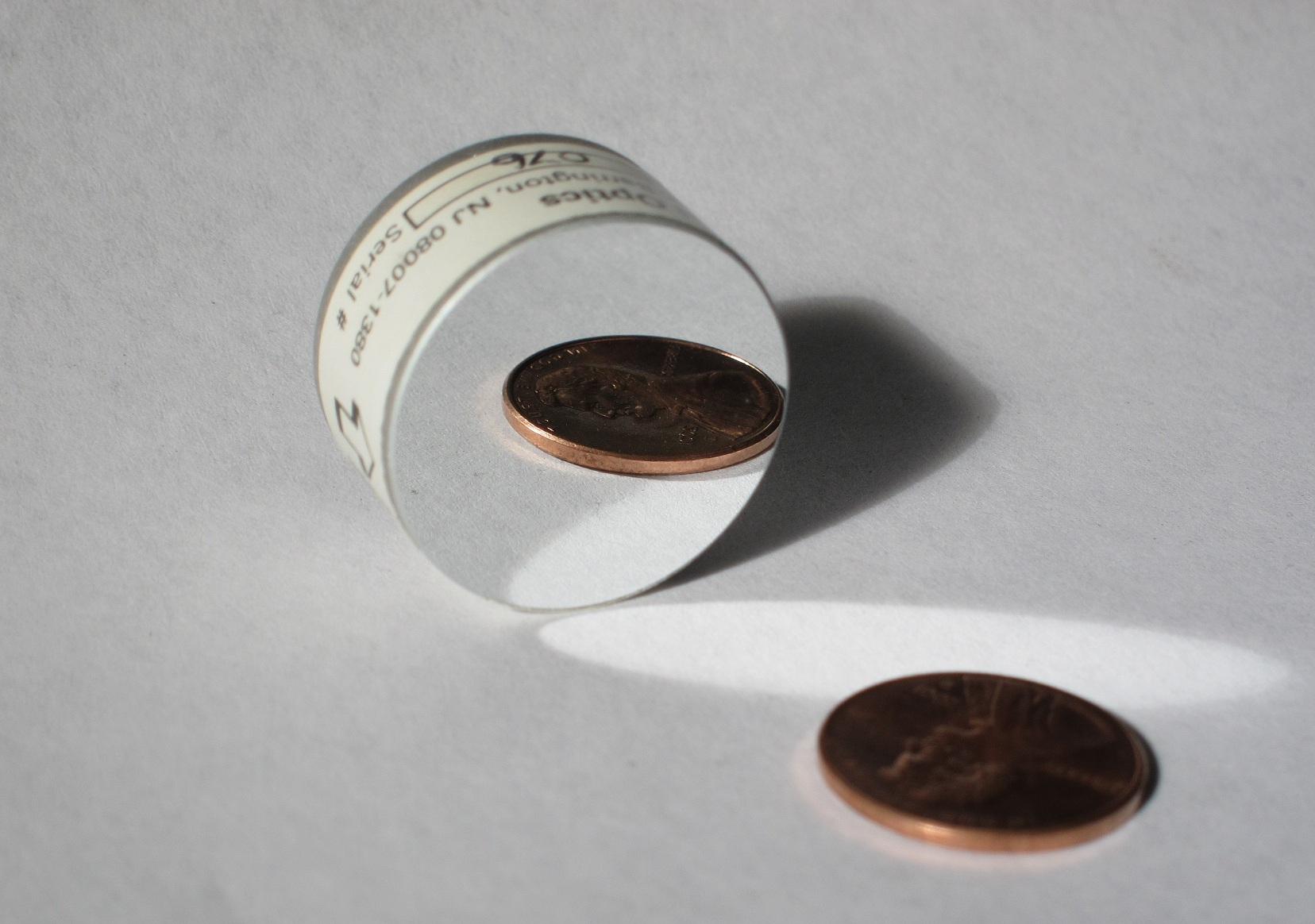
A first-surface mirror coated with aluminium and enhanced with dielectric coatings. The angle of the incident light (represented by both the light in the mirror and the shadow behind it) exactly matches the angle of reflection (the reflected light shining on the table).

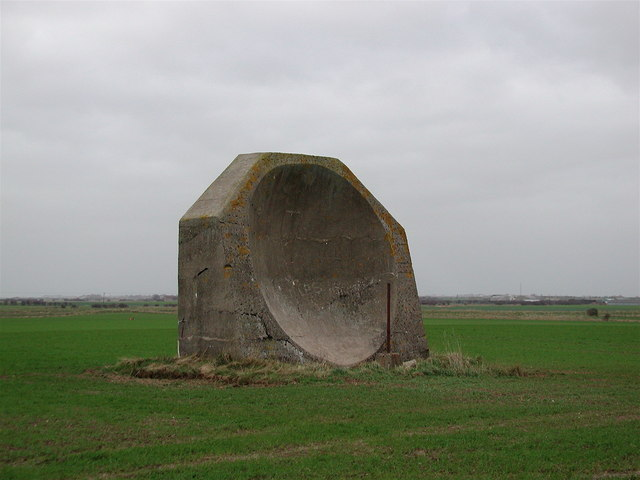
4.5-metre (15 ft)-tall acoustic mirror near Kilnsea Grange, East Yorkshire, UK, from World War I. The mirror magnified the sound of approaching enemy Zeppelins for a microphone placed at the focal point. Sound waves are much longer than light waves, thus the object produces diffuse reflections in the visual spectrum.

A mirror, also known as a looking glass, is an object that reflects an image. Light that bounces off a mirror forms an image of whatever is in front of it, which is then focused through the lens of the eye or a camera. Mirrors reverse the direction of light at an angle equal to its incidence. This allows the viewer to see themselves or objects behind them, or even objects that are at an angle from them but out of their field of view, such as around a corner. Natural mirrors have existed since prehistoric times, such as the surface of water, but people have been manufacturing mirrors out of a variety of materials for thousands of years, like stone, metals, and glass. In modern mirrors, metals like silver or aluminium are often used due to their high reflectivity, applied as a thin coating on glass because of its naturally smooth and hard surface.

A mirror is a wave reflector. Light consists of waves, and when light waves reflect from the flat surface of a mirror, those waves retain the same degree of curvature and vergence, in an equal yet opposite direction, as the original waves. This allows the waves to form an image when they are focused through a lens, just as if the waves had originated from the direction of the mirror. The light can also be pictured as rays (imaginary lines radiating from the light source, that are always perpendicular to the waves). These rays are reflected at an equal yet opposite angle from which they strike the mirror (incident light). This property, called specular reflection, distinguishes a mirror from objects that diffuse light, breaking up the wave and scattering it in many directions (such as flat-white paint). Thus, a mirror can be any surface in which the texture or roughness of the surface is smaller (smoother) than the wavelength of the waves.

When looking at a mirror, one will see a mirror image or reflected image of objects in the environment, formed by light emitted or scattered by them and reflected by the mirror towards one's eyes. This effect gives the illusion that those objects are behind the mirror, or (sometimes) in front of it. When the surface is not flat, a mirror may behave like a reflecting lens. A plane mirror yields a real-looking undistorted image, while a curved mirror may distort, magnify, or reduce the image in various ways, while keeping the lines, contrast, sharpness, colors, and other image properties intact.

A mirror is commonly used for inspecting oneself, such as during personal grooming; hence the old-fashioned name "looking glass". This use, which dates from prehistory, overlaps with uses in decoration and architecture. Mirrors are also used to view other items that are not directly visible because of obstructions; examples include rear-view mirrors in vehicles, security mirrors in or around buildings, and dentist's mirrors. Mirrors are also used in optical and scientific apparatus such as telescopes, lasers, cameras, periscopes, and industrial machinery.

According to superstitions breaking a mirror is said to bring seven years of bad luck.

The terms "mirror" and "reflector" can be used for objects that reflect any other types of waves. An acoustic mirror reflects sound waves. Objects such as walls, ceilings, or natural rock-formations may produce echos, and this tendency often becomes a problem in acoustical engineering when designing houses, auditoriums, or recording studios. Acoustic mirrors may be used for applications such as parabolic microphones, atmospheric studies, sonar, and seafloor mapping. An atomic mirror reflects matter waves and can be used for atomic interferometry and atomic holography.

== History ==
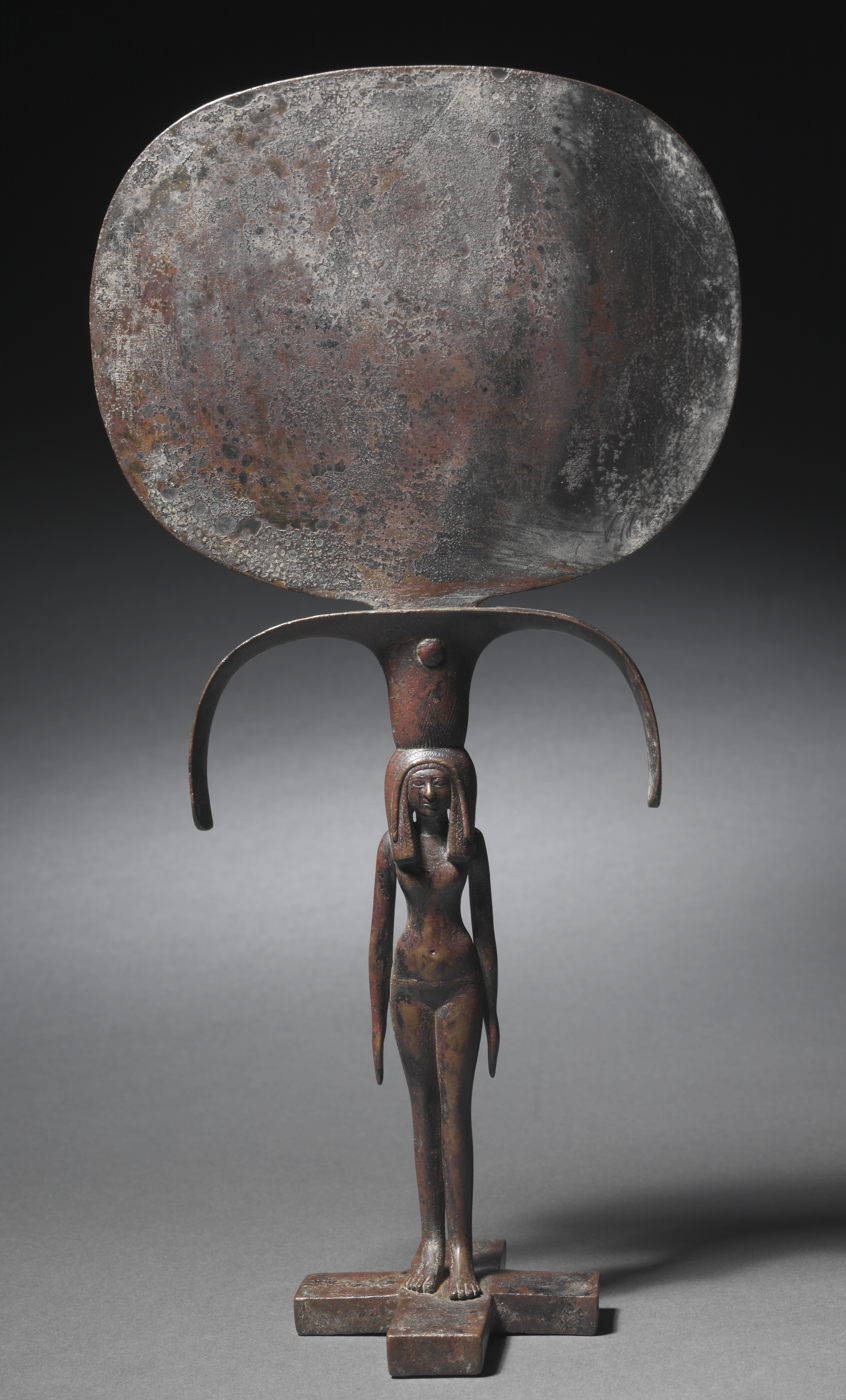
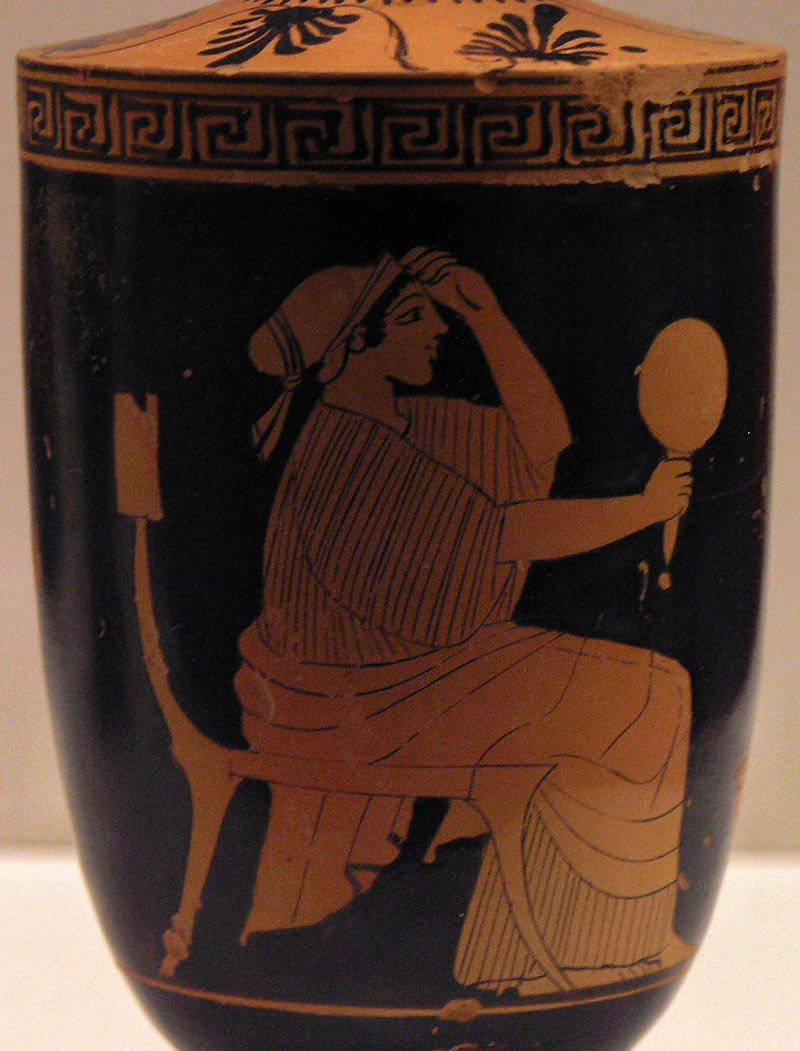
Left: Bronze mirror, New Kingdom of Egypt, Eighteenth Dynasty, 1540–1296 BC, Cleveland Museum of Art (U.S.)
Right: seated woman holding a mirror; Ancient Greek Attic red-figure lekythos by the Sabouroff Painter, c. 470–460 BC, National Archaeological Museum, Athens (Greece)

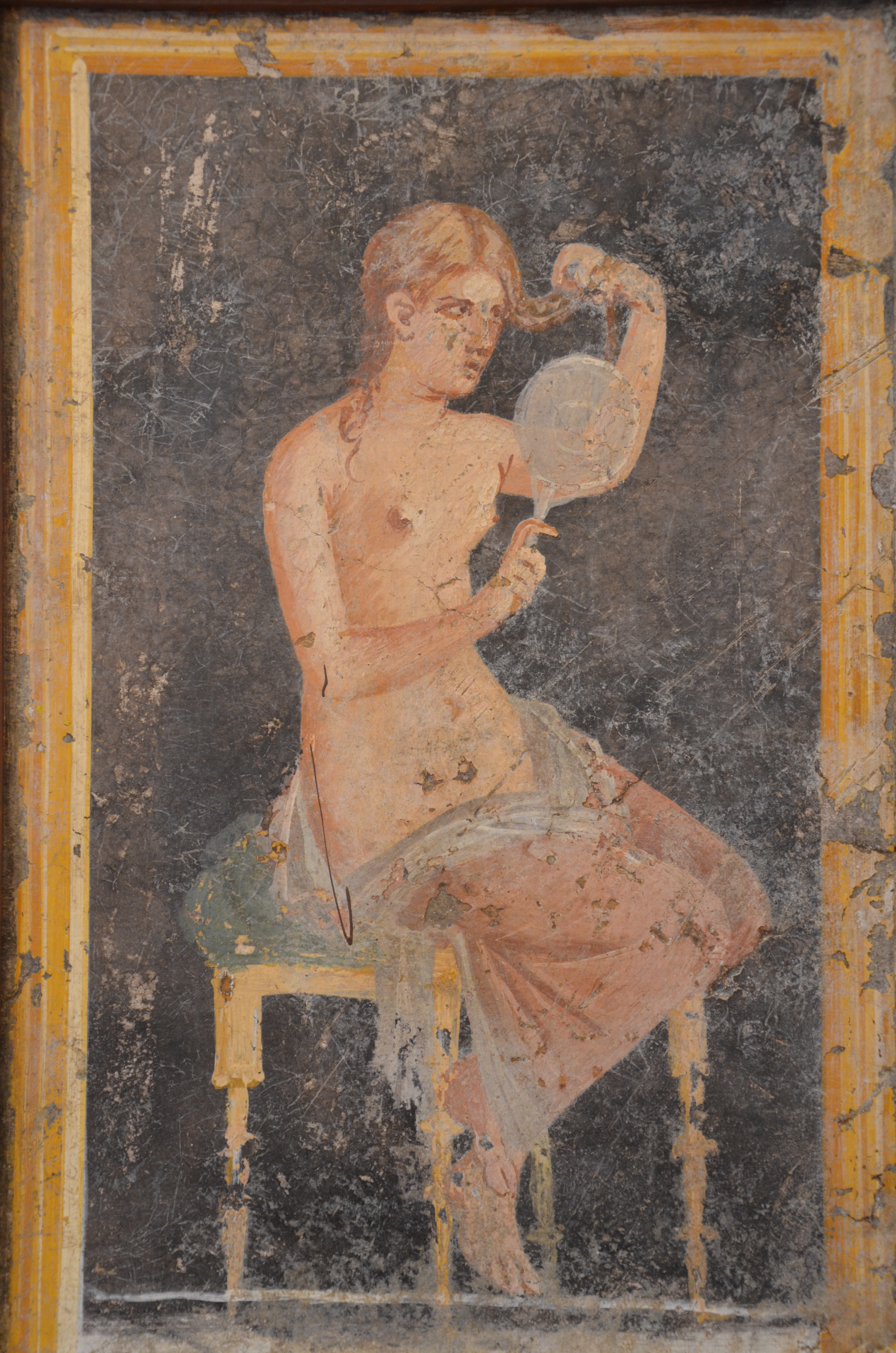
Roman fresco of a woman fixing her hair using a mirror, from Stabiae, Italy, 1st century AD

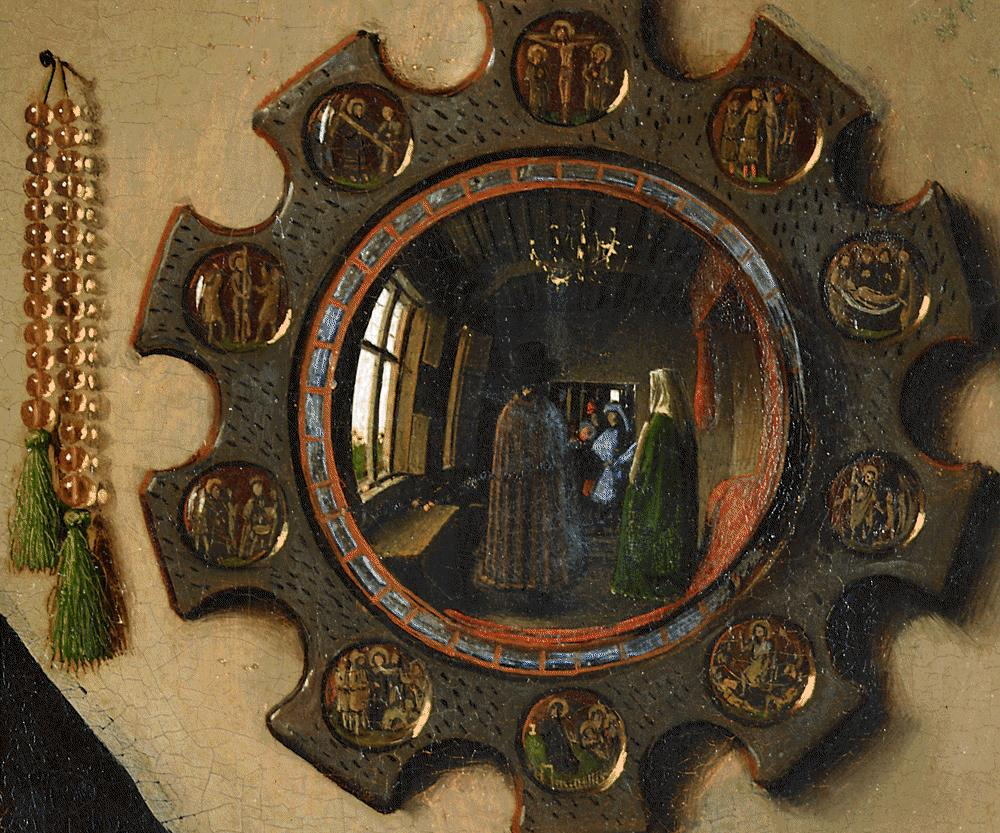
Detail of the convex mirror from the Arnolfini Portrait, Bruges, 1434

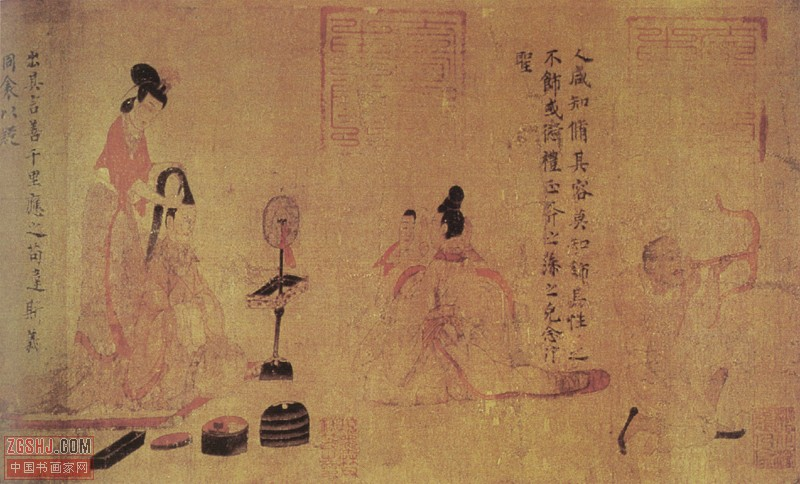
'Adorning Oneself', detail from 'Admonitions of the Instructress to the Palace Ladies', Tang dynasty copy of an original by Chinese painter Gu Kaizhi, c. 344–405

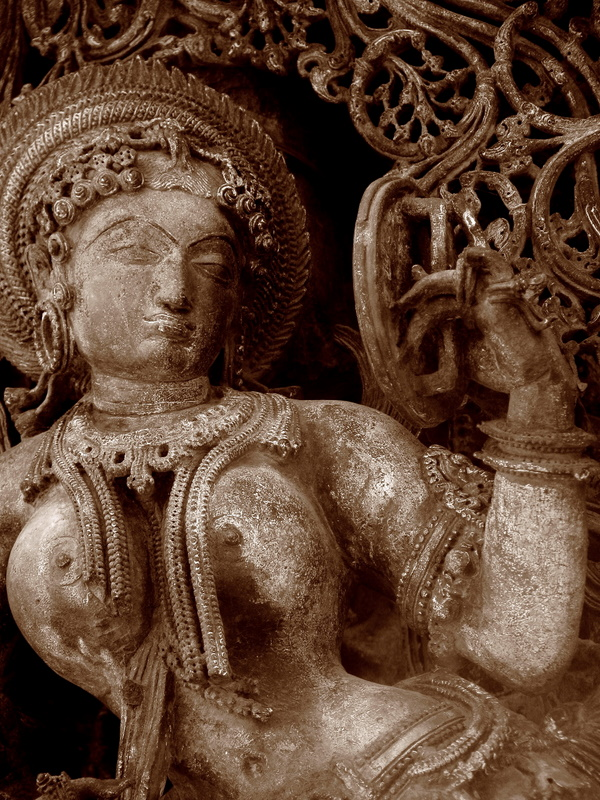
Sculpture of a woman looking into a mirror, from Halebidu, India, in the 12th century

=== Prehistory ===
The first mirrors used by humans were most likely pools of still water, or shiny stones. The requirements for making a good mirror are a surface with a very high degree of flatness (preferably but not necessarily with high reflectivity), and a surface roughness smaller than the wavelength of the light.

The earliest manufactured mirrors were pieces of polished stone such as obsidian, a naturally occurring volcanic glass. Examples of obsidian mirrors found at Çatalhöyük in Anatolia (modern-day Turkey) have been dated to around 6000 BCE. Mirrors of polished copper were crafted in Mesopotamia from 4000 BCE, and in ancient Egypt from around 3000 BCE. Polished stone mirrors from Central and South America date from around 2000 BCE onwards.

=== Bronze Age to Early Middle Ages ===
By the Bronze Age most cultures were using mirrors made from polished discs of bronze, copper, silver, or other metals. The people of Kerma in Nubia were skilled in the manufacturing of mirrors. Remains of their bronze kilns have been found within the temple of Kerma. In China, bronze mirrors were manufactured from around 2000 BC, some of the earliest bronze and copper examples being produced by the Qijia culture. Such metal mirrors remained the norm through to Greco-Roman Antiquity and throughout the Middle Ages in Europe. During the Roman Empire silver mirrors were in wide use by servants.

Speculum metal is a highly reflective alloy of copper and tin that was used for mirrors until a couple of centuries ago. Up until the mid-19th century, many astronomical telescopes used speculum metal mirrors. Isaac Newton's reflecting telescope of 1668 used speculum metal, as did Australia's Great Melbourne Telescope, installed in 1869. Speculum metal mirrors may have originated in China and India. Mirrors of speculum metal or any precious metal were hard to produce and were only owned by the wealthy.

Common metal mirrors tarnished and required frequent polishing. Bronze mirrors had low reflectivity and poor color rendering, and stone mirrors were much worse in this regard. These defects explain the New Testament reference in 1 Corinthians 13 to seeing "as in a mirror, darkly."

The Greek philosopher Socrates urged young people to look at themselves in mirrors so that, if they were beautiful, they would become worthy of their beauty, and if they were ugly, they would know how to hide their disgrace through learning.

Glass began to be used for mirrors in the 1st century CE, with the development of soda–lime glass and glass blowing. The Roman scholar Pliny the Elder claims that artisans in Sidon (modern-day Lebanon) were producing glass mirrors coated with lead or gold leaf in the back. The metal provided good reflectivity, and the glass provided a smooth surface and protected the metal from scratches and tarnishing. However, there is no archeological evidence of glass mirrors before the third century.

These early glass mirrors were made by blowing a glass bubble, and then cutting off a small circular section from 10 to 20 cm in diameter. Their surface was either concave or convex, and imperfections tended to distort the image. Lead-coated mirrors were very thin to prevent cracking by the heat of the molten metal. Due to the poor quality, high cost, and small size of glass mirrors, solid-metal mirrors (primarily of steel) remained in common use until the late nineteenth century.

Silver-coated metal mirrors were developed in China as early as 500 CE. The bare metal was coated with an amalgam, then heated until the mercury boiled away.

=== Middle Ages and Renaissance ===
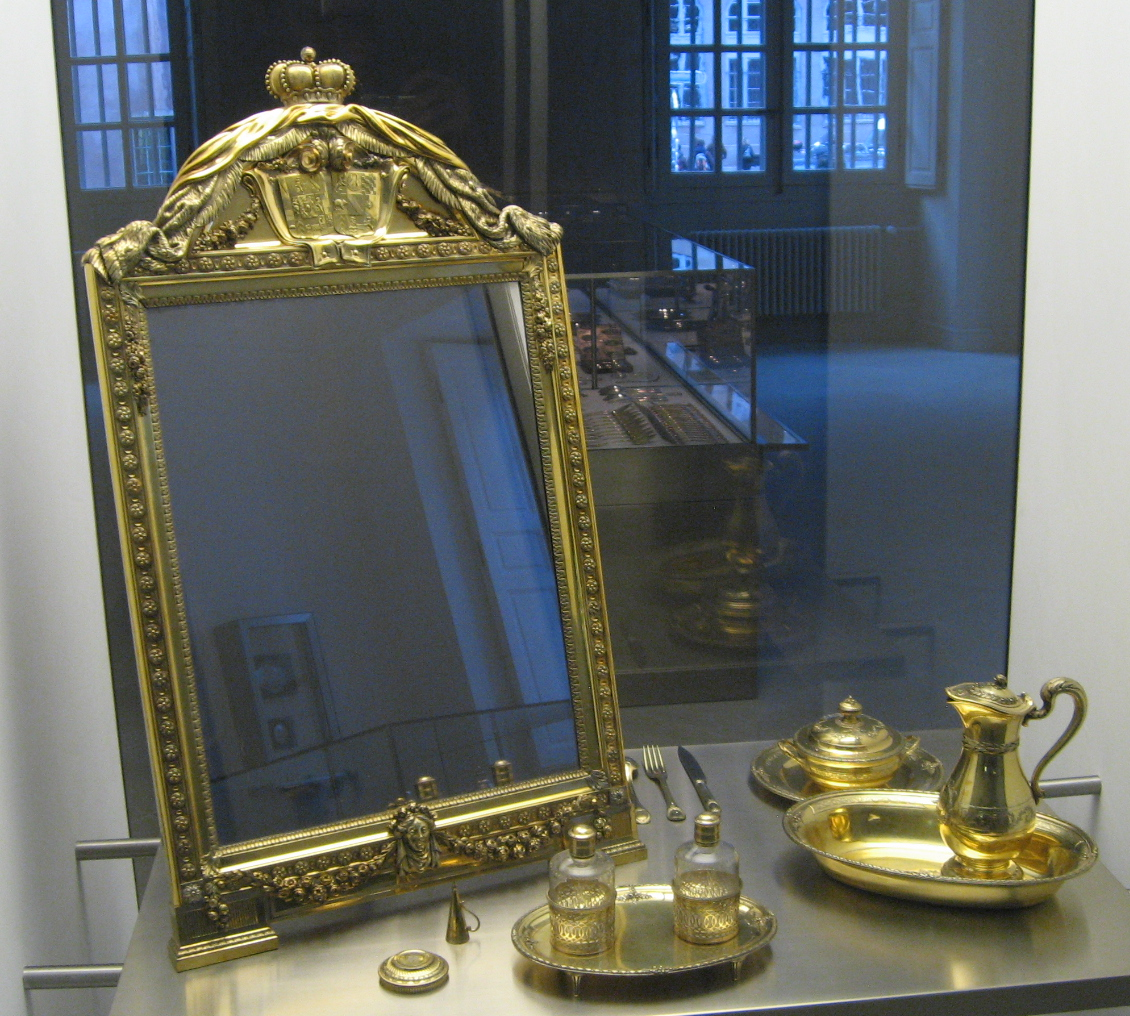
An 18th century vermeil mirror in the Musée des Arts décoratifs, Strasbourg

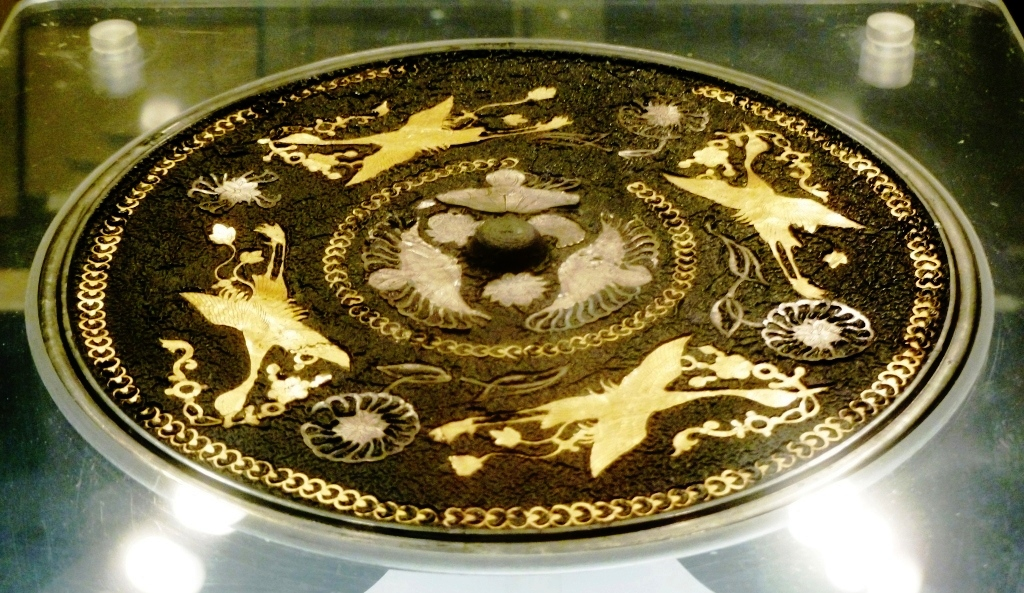
A mirror with lacquered back inlaid with four phoenixes holding ribbons in their mouths during the Tang dynasty in eastern Xi'an

The evolution of glass mirrors in the Middle Ages followed improvements in glassmaking technology. Glassmakers in France made flat glass plates by blowing glass bubbles, spinning them rapidly to flatten them, and cutting rectangles out of them. A better method, developed in Germany and perfected in Venice by the 16th century, was to blow a cylinder of glass, cut off the ends, slice it along its length, and unroll it onto a flat hot plate. Venetian glassmakers also adopted lead glass for mirrors, because of its crystal-clarity and its easier workability.

During the early European Renaissance, a fire-gilding technique developed to produce an even and highly reflective tin coating for glass mirrors. The back of the glass was coated with a tin–mercury amalgam, and the mercury was then evaporated by heating the piece. This process caused less thermal shock to the glass than the older molten-lead method. The date and location of the discovery is unknown, but by the 16th century Venice was a center of mirror production using this technique. These Venetian mirrors were up to 40 inches (100 cm) square.

Venice retained its monopoly on the tin amalgam technique for a century. Venetian mirrors in richly decorated frames served as luxury decorations for palaces throughout Europe, and were very expensive. For example, in the late seventeenth century, the Countess de Fiesque was reported to have traded an entire wheat farm for a mirror, considering it a bargain. However, by the end of that century the secret was leaked through industrial espionage. French workshops succeeded in large-scale industrialization of the process, eventually making mirrors affordable to the masses, in spite of the toxicity of mercury's vapor.

=== Industrial Revolution ===
The invention of the ribbon machine in the late Industrial Revolution allowed modern glass panes to be produced in bulk. The Saint-Gobain factory, founded by royal initiative in France, was an important manufacturer, and Bohemian and German glass, often rather cheaper, was also important.

The invention of the silvered-glass mirror is credited to German chemist Justus von Liebig in 1835. His wet deposition process involved the deposition of a thin layer of metallic silver onto glass through the chemical reduction of silver nitrate. This silvering process was adapted for mass manufacturing and led to the greater availability of affordable mirrors.

=== Contemporary technologies ===
Mirrors are often produced by the wet deposition of silver, or sometimes nickel or chromium (the latter used most often in automotive mirrors) via electroplating directly onto the glass substrate.

Glass mirrors for optical instruments are usually produced by vacuum deposition methods. These techniques can be traced to observations in the 1920s and 1930s that metal was being ejected from electrodes in gas discharge lamps and condensed on the glass walls forming a mirror-like coating. The phenomenon, called sputtering, was developed into an industrial metal-coating method with the development of semiconductor technology in the 1970s.

A similar phenomenon had been observed with incandescent light bulbs: the metal in the hot filament would slowly sublimate and condense on the bulb's walls. This phenomenon was developed into the method of evaporation coating by Pohl and Pringsheim in 1912. John D. Strong used evaporation coating to make the first aluminium-coated telescope mirrors in the 1930s. The first dielectric mirror was created in 1937 by Auwarter using evaporated rhodium.

The metal coating of glass mirrors is usually protected from abrasion and corrosion by a layer of paint applied over it. Mirrors for optical instruments often have the metal layer on the front face, so that the light does not have to cross the glass twice. In these mirrors, the metal may be protected by a thin transparent coating of a non-metallic (dielectric) material. The first metallic mirror to be enhanced with a dielectric coating of silicon dioxide was created by Hass in 1937. In 1939 at the Schott Glass company, Walter Geffcken invented the first dielectric mirrors to use multilayer coatings.

=== Burning mirrors ===
The Greek in Classical Antiquity were familiar with the use of mirrors to concentrate light. Parabolic mirrors were described and studied by the mathematician Diocles in his work On Burning Mirrors. Ptolemy conducted a number of experiments with curved polished iron mirrors, and discussed plane, convex spherical, and concave spherical mirrors in his Optics.

Parabolic mirrors were also described by the Caliphate mathematician Ibn Sahl in the tenth century.

== Types of mirrors ==
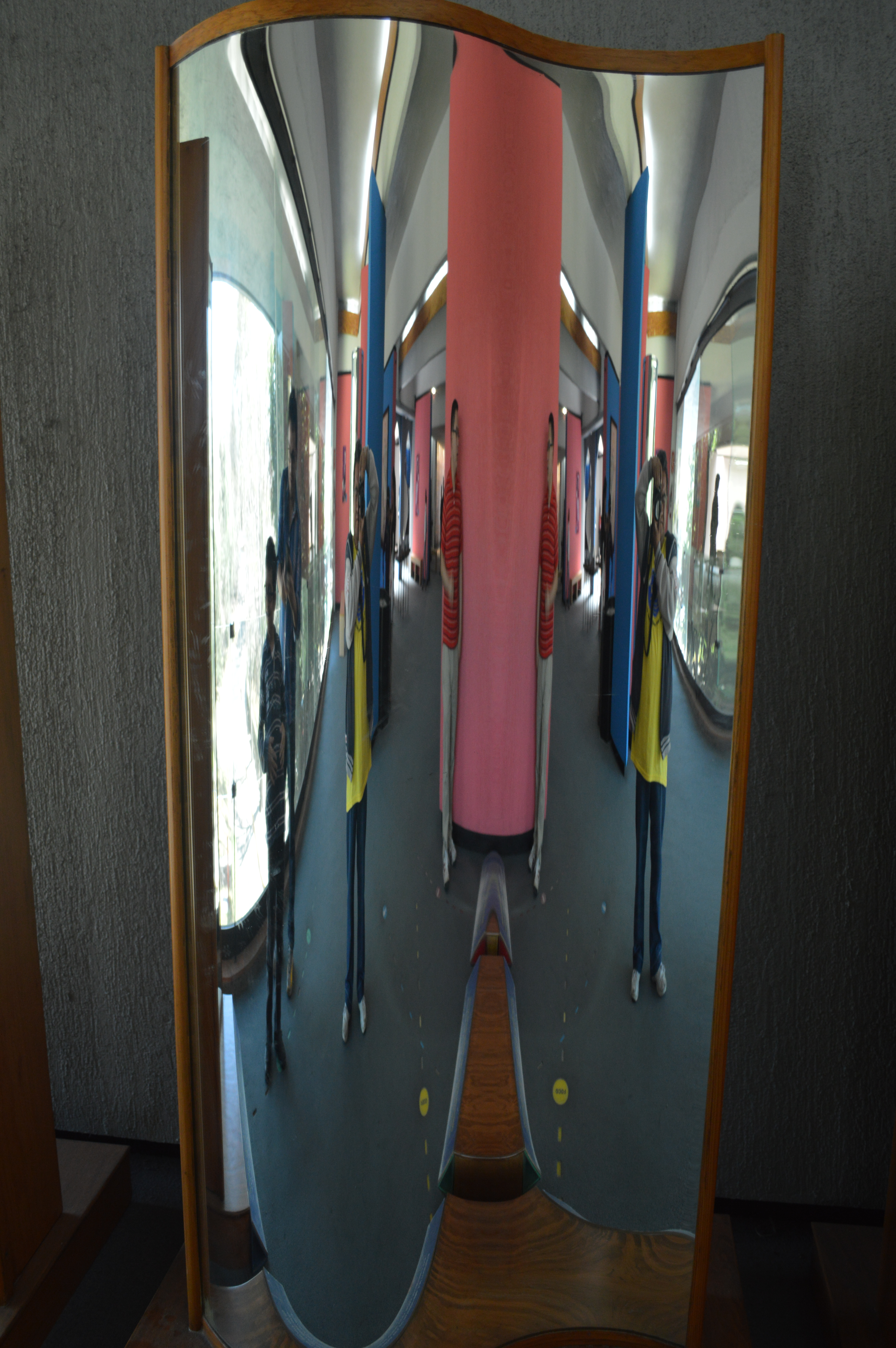
A curved mirror at the Universum museum in Mexico City. The image splits between the convex and concave curves.

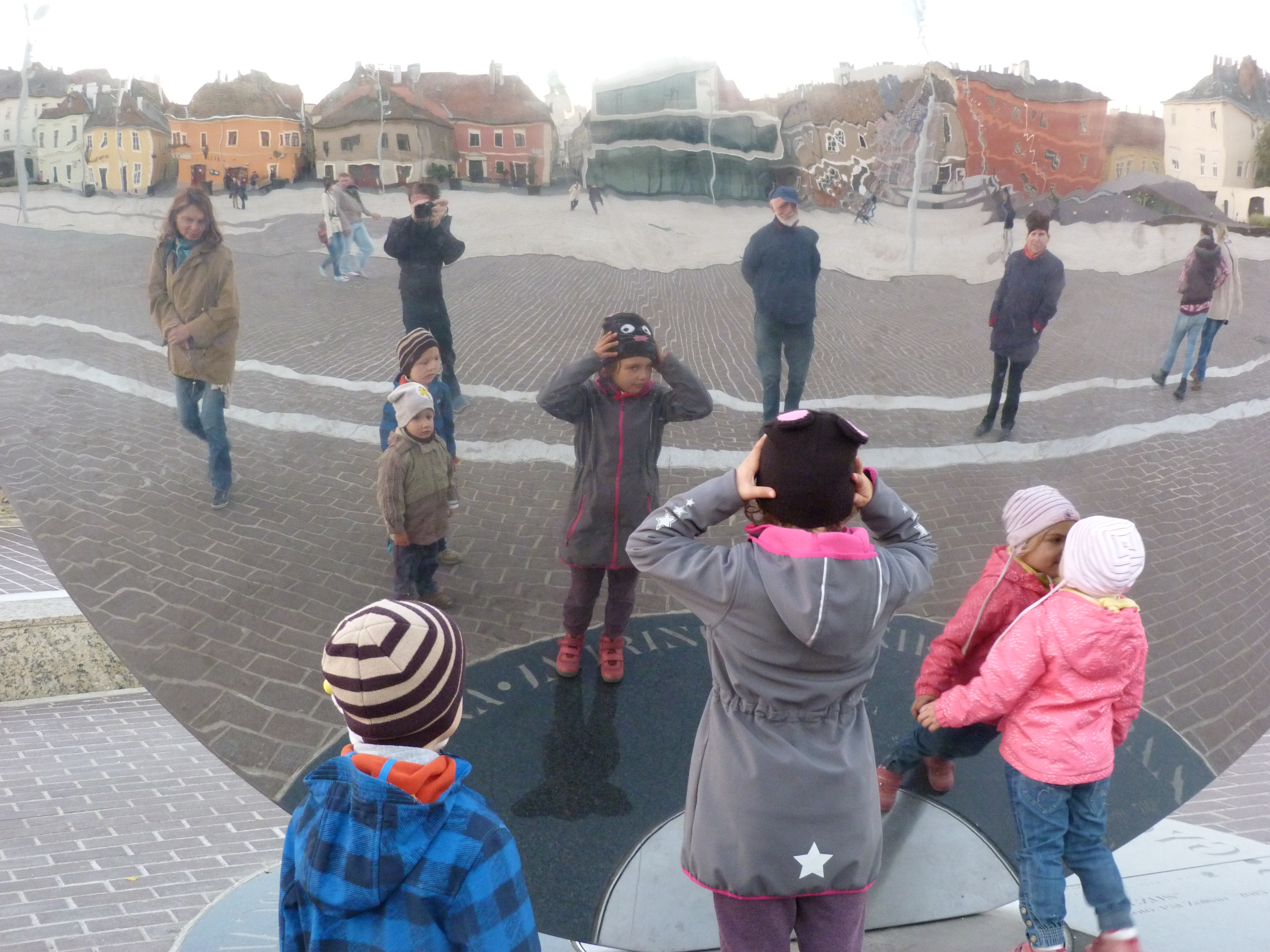
A large convex mirror. Distortions in the image increase with the viewing distance.

Mirrors can be classified in many ways; including by shape, support, reflective materials, manufacturing methods, and intended application.

=== By shape ===
Typical mirror shapes are planar and curved mirrors.

The surface of curved mirrors is often a part of a sphere. Mirrors that are meant to precisely concentrate parallel rays of light into a point are usually made in the shape of a paraboloid of revolution instead; they are used in telescopes (from radio waves to X-rays), in antennas to communicate with broadcast satellites, and in solar furnaces. A segmented mirror, consisting of multiple flat or curved mirrors, properly placed and oriented, may be used instead.

Mirrors that are intended to concentrate sunlight onto a long pipe may be a circular cylinder or of a parabolic cylinder.

=== By structural material ===
The most common structural material for mirrors is glass, due to its transparency, ease of fabrication, rigidity, hardness, and ability to take a smooth finish.

==== Back-silvered mirrors ====
The most common mirrors consist of a plate of transparent glass, with a thin reflective layer on the back (the side opposite to the incident and reflected light) backed by a coating that protects that layer against abrasion, tarnishing, and corrosion. The glass is usually soda–lime glass, but lead glass may be used for decorative effects, and other transparent materials may be used for specific applications.

A plate of transparent plastic may be used instead of glass, for lighter weight or impact resistance. Alternatively, a flexible transparent plastic film may be bonded to the front and/or back surface of the mirror, to prevent injuries in case the mirror is broken. Lettering or decorative designs may be printed on the front face of the glass, or formed on the reflective layer. The front surface may have an anti-reflection coating.

==== Front-silvered mirrors ====
Mirrors which are reflective on the front surface (the same side of the incident and reflected light) may be made of any rigid material. The supporting material does not necessarily need to be transparent, but telescope mirrors often use glass anyway. Often a protective transparent coating is added on top of the reflecting layer, to protect it against abrasion, tarnishing, and corrosion, or to absorb certain wavelengths.

==== Flexible mirrors ====
Thin flexible plastic mirrors are sometimes used for safety, since they cannot shatter or produce sharp flakes. Their flatness is achieved by stretching them on a rigid frame. These usually consist of a layer of evaporated aluminium between two thin layers of transparent plastic.

=== By reflective material ===
A dielectric mirror-stack works on the principle of thin-film interference. Each layer has a different refractive index, allowing each interface to produce a small amount of reflection. When the thickness of the layers is proportional to the chosen wavelength, the multiple reflections constructively interfere. Stacks may consist of a few to hundreds of individual coats.

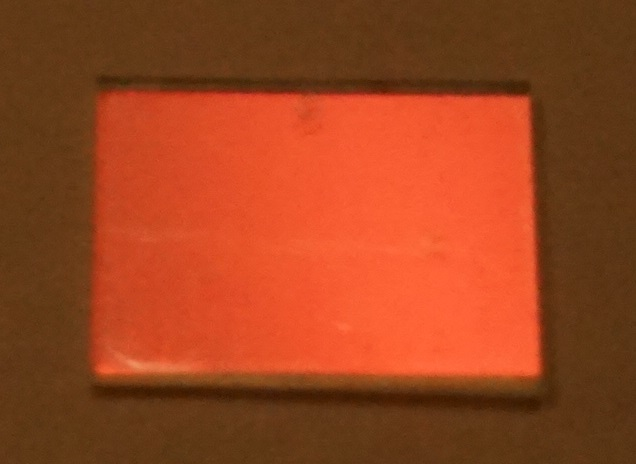
A hot mirror used in a camera to reduce red eye

In common mirrors, the reflective layer is usually some metal like silver, tin, nickel, or chromium, deposited by a wet process; or aluminium, deposited by sputtering or evaporation in vacuum. The reflective layer may also be made of one or more layers of transparent materials with suitable indices of refraction.

The structural material may be a metal, in which case the reflecting layer may be just the surface of the same. Metal concave dishes are often used to reflect infrared light (such as in space heaters) or microwaves (as in satellite TV antennas). Liquid metal telescopes use a surface of liquid metal such as mercury.

Mirrors that reflect only part of the light, while transmitting some of the rest, can be made with very thin metal layers or suitable combinations of dielectric layers. They are typically used as beamsplitters. A dichroic mirror, in particular, has surface that reflects certain wavelengths of light, while letting other wavelengths pass through. A cold mirror is a dichroic mirror that efficiently reflects the entire visible light spectrum while transmitting infrared wavelengths. A hot mirror is the opposite: it reflects infrared light while transmitting visible light. Dichroic mirrors are often used as filters to remove undesired components of the light in cameras and measuring instruments.

In X-ray telescopes, the X-rays reflect off a highly precise metal surface at almost grazing angles, and only a small fraction of the rays are reflected. In flying relativistic mirrors conceived for X-ray lasers, the reflecting surface is a spherical shockwave (wake wave) created in a low-density plasma by a very intense laser-pulse, and moving at an extremely high velocity.

==== Nonlinear optical mirrors ====
A phase-conjugating mirror uses nonlinear optics to reverse the phase difference between incident beams. Such mirrors may be used, for example, for coherent beam combination. The useful applications are self-guiding of laser beams and correction of atmospheric distortions in imaging systems.

== Physical principles ==
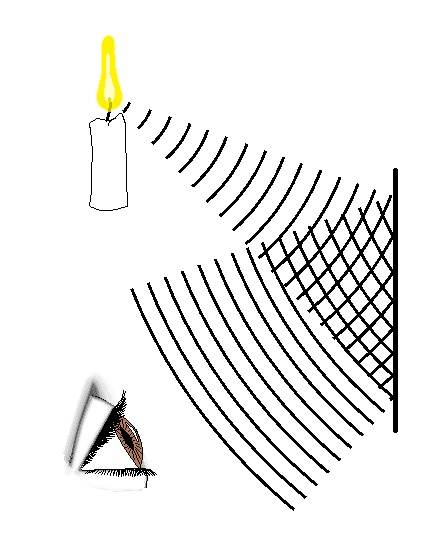
A mirror reflects light waves to the observer, preserving the wave's curvature and divergence, to form an image when focused through the lens of the eye. The angle of the impinging wave, as it traverses the mirror's surface, matches the angle of the reflected wave.

When a sufficiently narrow beam of light is reflected at a point of a locally flat surface, the surface's normal direction $\vec n$ will be the bisector of the angle formed by the two beams at that point. That is, the direction vector $\vec u$ towards the incident beams's source, the normal vector $\vec n$, and direction vector $\vec v$ of the reflected beam will be coplanar, and the angle between $\vec n$ and $\vec v$ will be equal to the angle of incidence between $\vec n$ and $\vec u$, but of opposite sign.

This property can be explained by the physics of an electromagnetic plane wave that is incident to a flat surface that is electrically conductive or where the speed of light changes abruptly, as between two materials with different indices of refraction.

- When parallel beams of light are reflected on a plane surface, the reflected rays will be parallel too.
- If the reflecting surface is concave, the reflected beams will be convergent, at least to some extent and for some distance from the surface.
- A convex mirror, on the other hand, will reflect parallel rays towards divergent directions.

More specifically, a concave parabolic mirror (whose surface is a part of a paraboloid of revolution) will reflect rays that are parallel to its axis into rays that pass through its focus. Conversely, a parabolic concave mirror will reflect any ray that comes from its focus towards a direction parallel to its axis. If a concave mirror surface is a part of a prolate ellipsoid, it will reflect any ray coming from one focus toward the other focus.

A convex parabolic mirror, on the other hand, will reflect rays that are parallel to its axis into rays that seem to emanate from the focus of the surface, behind the mirror. Conversely, it will reflect incoming rays that converge toward that point into rays that are parallel to the axis. A convex mirror that is part of a prolate ellipsoid will reflect rays that converge towards one focus into divergent rays that seem to emanate from the other focus.

Spherical mirrors do not reflect parallel rays to rays that converge to or diverge from a single point, or vice versa, due to spherical aberration. However, a spherical mirror whose diameter is sufficiently small compared to the sphere's radius will behave very similarly to a parabolic mirror whose axis goes through the mirror's center and the center of that sphere; so that spherical mirrors can substitute for parabolic ones in many applications.

A similar aberration occurs with parabolic mirrors when the incident rays are parallel among themselves but not parallel to the mirror's axis, or are divergent from a point that is not the focus – as when trying to form an image of an object that is near the mirror or spans a wide angle as seen from it. However, this aberration can be sufficiently small if the object image is sufficiently far from the mirror and spans a sufficiently small angle around its axis.

=== Mirror images ===
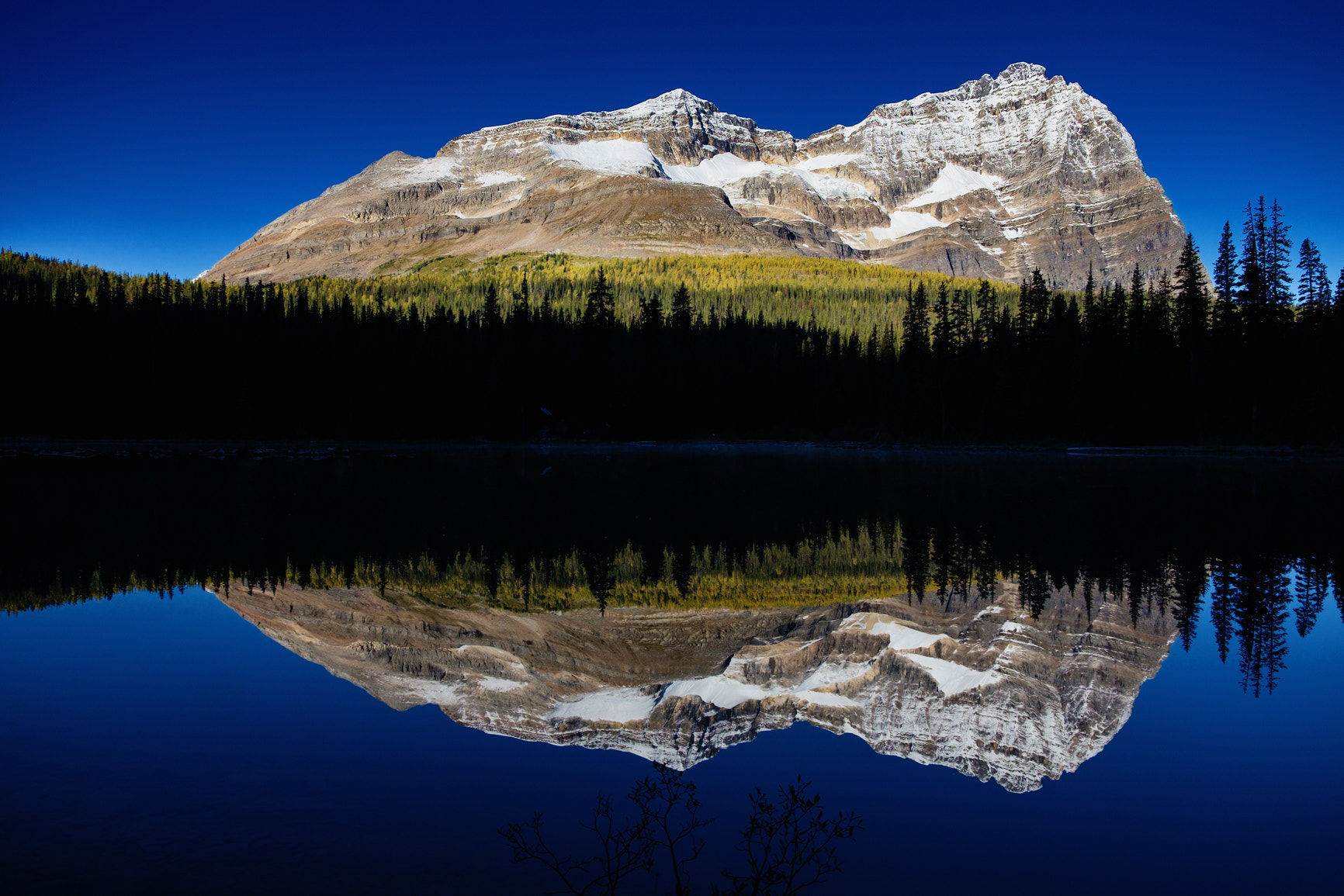
A mirror reverses an image in the direction of the normal angle of incidence. When the surface is at a 90°, horizontal angle from the object, the image appears inverted 180° along the vertical (right and left remain on the correct sides, but the image appears upside down), because the normal angle of incidence points down vertically toward the water.

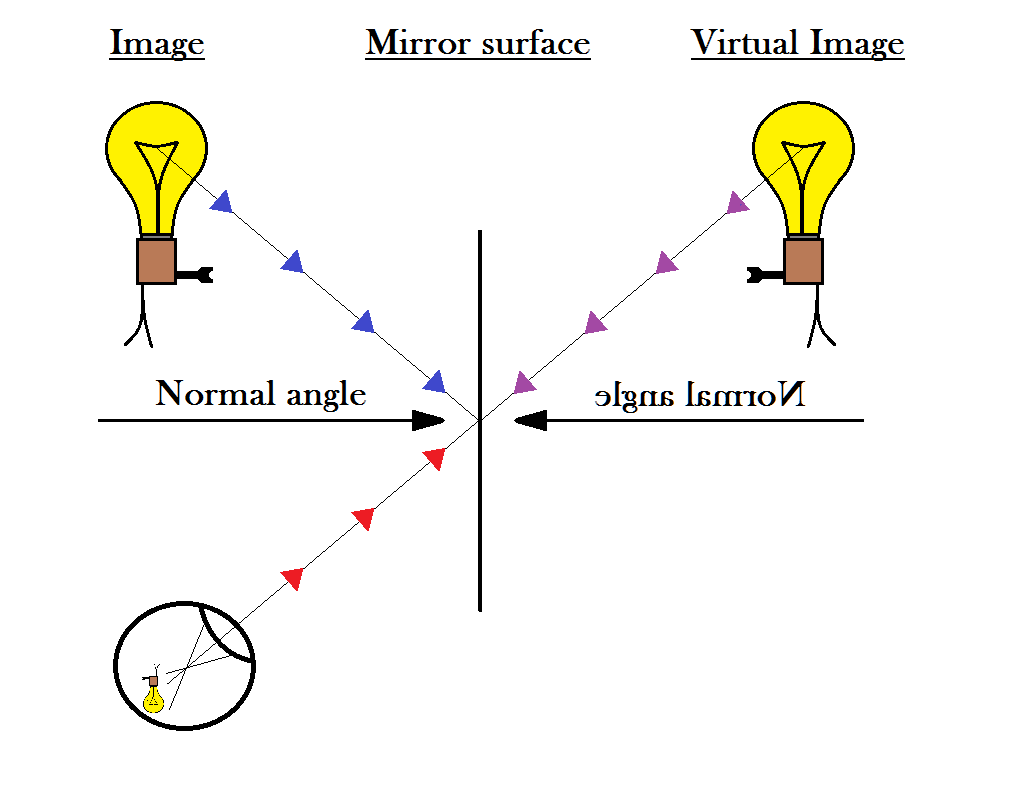
A mirror reflects a real image (blue) back to the observer (red), forming a virtual image; a perceptual illusion that objects in the image are behind the mirror's surface and facing the opposite direction (purple). The arrows indicate the direction of the real and perceived images, and the reversal is analogous to viewing a movie with the film facing backwards, except the "screen" is the viewer's retina.

Mirrors reflect an image to the observer. However, unlike a projected image on a screen, an image does not actually exist on the surface of the mirror. For example, when two people look at each other in a mirror, both see different images on the same surface. When the light waves converge through the lens of the eye they interfere with each other to form the image on the surface of the retina, and since both viewers see waves coming from different directions, each sees a different image in the same mirror. Thus, the images observed in a mirror depend upon the angle of the mirror with respect to the eye. The angle between the object and the observer is always twice the angle between the eye and the normal, or the direction perpendicular to the surface. This allows animals with binocular vision to see the reflected image with depth perception and in three dimensions.

The mirror forms a virtual image of whatever is in the opposite angle from the viewer, meaning that objects in the image appear to exist in a direct line of sight—behind the surface of the mirror—at an equal distance from their position in front of the mirror. Objects behind the observer, or between the observer and the mirror, are reflected back to the observer without any actual change in orientation; the light waves are simply reversed in a direction perpendicular to the mirror. However, when viewer is facing the object and the mirror is at an angle between them, the image appears inverted 180° along the direction of the angle.

Objects viewed in a (plane) mirror will appear laterally inverted (e.g., if one raises one's right hand, the image's left hand will appear to go up in the mirror), but not vertically inverted (in the image a person's head still appears above their body). However, a mirror does not actually "swap" left and right any more than it swaps top and bottom. A mirror swaps front and back. To be precise, it reverses the object in the direction perpendicular to the mirror surface (the normal), turning the three dimensional image inside out (the way a glove stripped off the hand can be turned inside out, turning a left-hand glove into a right-hand glove or vice versa). When a person raises their left hand, the actual left hand raises in the mirror, but gives the illusion of a right hand raising because the imaginary person in the mirror is literally inside-out, hand and all. If the person stands side-on to a mirror, the mirror really does reverse left and right hands, that is, objects that are physically closer to the mirror always appear closer in the virtual image, and objects farther from the surface always appear symmetrically farther away regardless of angle.

Looking at an image of oneself with the front-back axis flipped results in the perception of an image with its left-right axis flipped. When reflected in the mirror, a person's right hand remains directly opposite their real right hand, but it is perceived by the mind as the left hand in the image. When a person looks into a mirror, the image is actually front-back reversed (inside-out), which is an effect similar to the hollow-mask illusion. Notice that a mirror image is fundamentally different from the object (inside-out) and cannot be reproduced by simply rotating the object. An object and its mirror image are said to be chiral.

For things that may be considered as two-dimensional objects (like text), front-back reversal cannot usually explain the observed reversal. An image is a two-dimensional representation of a three-dimensional space, and because it exists in a two-dimensional plane, an image can be viewed from front or back. In the same way that text on a piece of paper appears reversed if held up to a light and viewed from behind, text held facing a mirror will appear reversed, because the image of the text is still facing away from the observer. Another way to understand the reversals observed in images of objects that are effectively two-dimensional is that the inversion of left and right in a mirror is due to the way human beings perceive their surroundings. A person's reflection in a mirror appears to be a real person facing them, but for that person to really face themselves (i.e.: twins) one would have to physically turn and face the other, causing an actual swapping of right and left. A mirror causes an illusion of left-right reversal because left and right were not swapped when the image appears to have turned around to face the viewer. The viewer's egocentric navigation (left and right with respect to the observer's point of view; i.e.: "my left...") is unconsciously replaced with their allocentric navigation (left and right as it relates another's point of view; "...your right") when processing the virtual image of the apparent person behind the mirror. Likewise, text viewed in a mirror would have to be physically turned around, facing the observer and away from the surface, actually swapping left and right, to be read in the mirror.

== Optical properties ==
=== Reflectivity ===
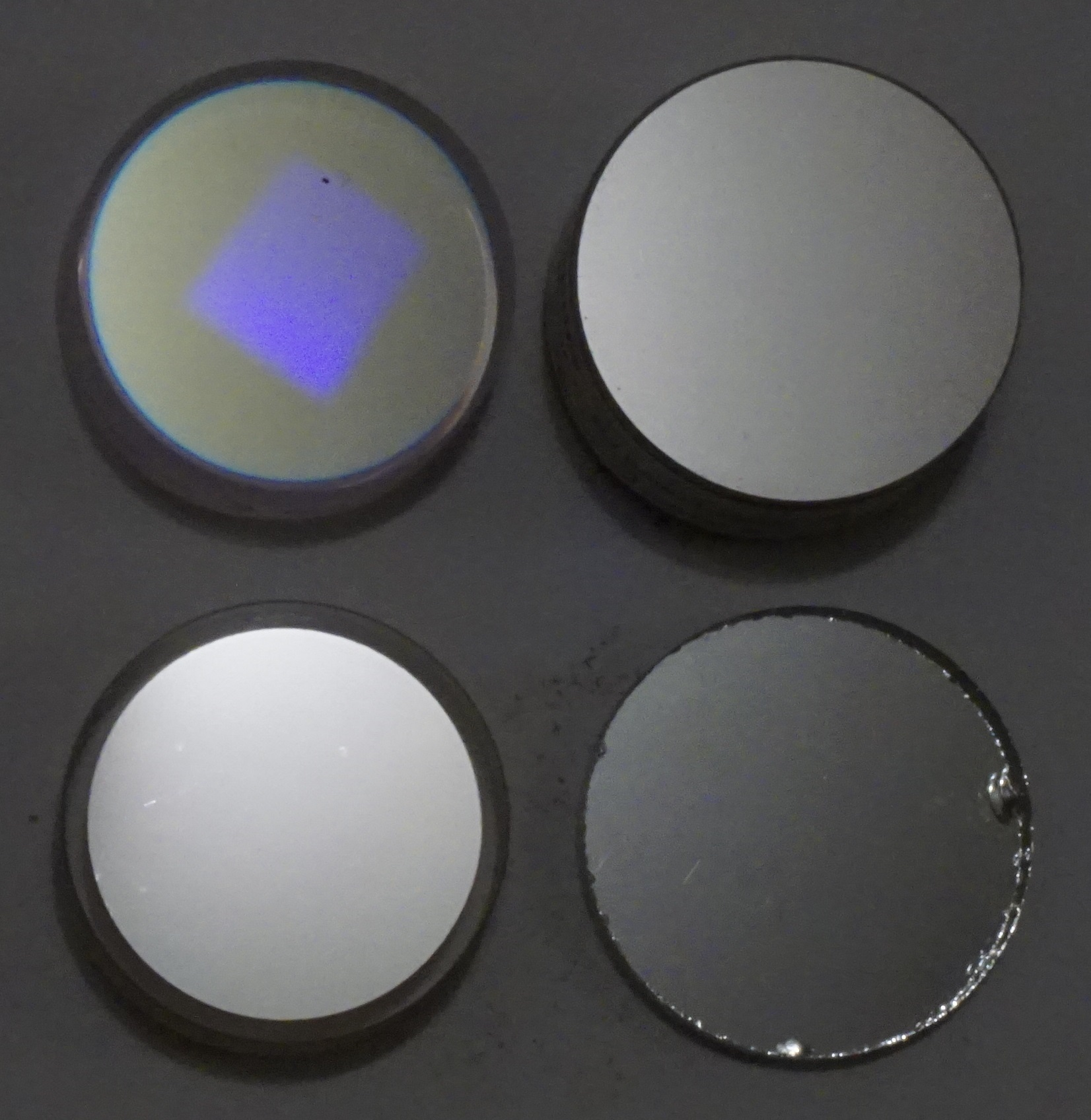
Four different mirrors, showing the difference in reflectivity. Clockwise from upper left: dielectric (80%), aluminium (85%), chrome (25%), and enhanced silver (99.9%). All are first-surface mirrors except the chrome mirror. The dielectric mirror reflects yellow light from the first-surface, but acts like an antireflection coating to purple light, thus produced a ghost reflection of the lightbulb from the second-surface.

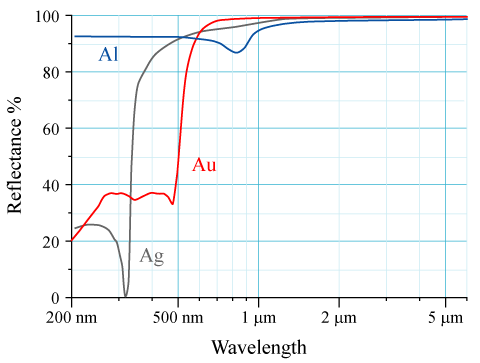
Spectral reflectance curves for aluminium (Al), silver (Ag), and gold (Au) metal mirrors at normal incidence.

The reflectivity of a mirror is determined by the percentage of reflected light per the total of the incident light. The reflectivity may vary with wavelength. All or a portion of the light not reflected is absorbed by the mirror, while in some cases a portion may also transmit through. Although some small portion of the light will be absorbed by the coating, the reflectivity is usually higher for first-surface mirrors, eliminating both reflection and absorption losses from the substrate.

The reflectivity is often determined by the type and thickness of the coating. When the thickness of the coating is sufficient to prevent transmission, all of the losses occur due to absorption. Aluminium is harder and more resistant to tarnishing than silver, and will reflect 85 to 90% of the light in the visible to near-ultraviolet range, but experiences a drop in its reflectance between 800 and 900 nm. Gold is very soft and easily scratched, but does not tarnish. Gold is greater than 96% reflective to near and far-infrared light between 800 and 12000 nm, but poorly reflects visible light with wavelengths shorter than 600 nm (yellow). Silver is expensive, soft, and quickly tarnishes, but has the highest reflectivity in the visual to near-infrared of any metal. Silver can reflect up to 98 or 99% of light to wavelengths as long as 2000 nm, but loses nearly all reflectivity at wavelengths shorter than 350 nm.

Dielectric mirrors can reflect greater than 99.99% of light, but only for a narrow range of wavelengths, ranging from a bandwidth of only 10 nm to as wide as 100 nm for tunable lasers. However, dielectric coatings can also enhance the reflectivity of metallic coatings and protect them from scratching or tarnishing. Dielectric materials are typically very hard and relatively cheap, however the number of coats needed generally makes it an expensive process. In mirrors with low tolerances, the coating thickness may be reduced to save cost, and simply covered with paint to absorb transmission.

=== Surface quality ===
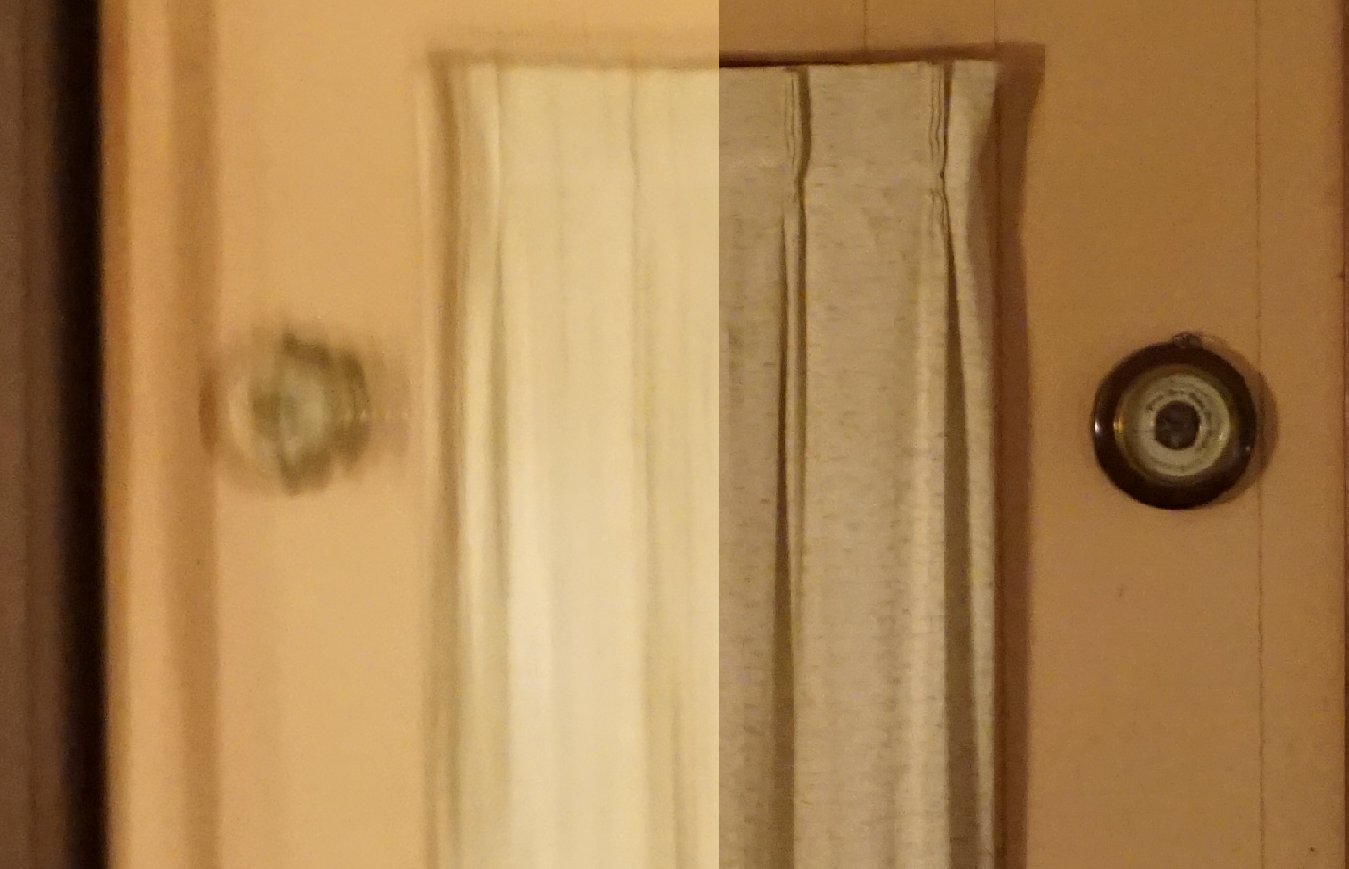
Flatness errors, like rippled dunes across the surface, produced these artifacts, distortion, and low image quality in the far field reflection of a household mirror.

Surface quality, or surface accuracy, measures the deviations from a perfect, ideal surface shape. Increasing the surface quality reduces distortion, artifacts, and aberration in images, and helps increase coherence, collimation, and reduce unwanted divergence in beams. For plane mirrors, this is often described in terms of flatness, while other surface shapes are compared to an ideal shape. The surface quality is typically measured with items like interferometers or optical flats, and are usually measured in wavelengths of light (λ). These deviations can be much larger or much smaller than the surface roughness. A normal household-mirror made with float glass may have flatness tolerances as low as 9–14λ per inch (25.4 mm), equating to a deviation of 5600 through 8800 nanometers from perfect flatness. Precision ground and polished mirrors intended for lasers or telescopes may have tolerances as high as λ/50 (1/50 of the wavelength of the light, or around 12 nm) across the entire surface. The surface quality can be affected by factors such as temperature changes, internal stress in the substrate, or even bending effects that occur when combining materials with different coefficients of thermal expansion, similar to a bimetallic strip.

=== Surface roughness ===
Surface roughness describes the texture of the surface, often in terms of the depth of the microscopic scratches left by the polishing operations. Surface roughness determines how much of the reflection is specular and how much diffuses, controlling how clear or cloudy the image will be.

For perfectly specular reflection, the surface roughness must be kept smaller than the wavelength of the light. Microwaves, which sometimes have a wavelength greater than an inch (~25 mm) can reflect specularly off a metal screen-door, continental ice-sheets, or desert sand, while visible light, having wavelengths of only a few hundred nanometers (a few hundred-thousandths of an inch), must meet a very smooth surface to produce specular reflection. For wavelengths that are approaching or are even shorter than the diameter of the atoms, such as X-rays, specular reflection can only be produced by surfaces that are at a grazing incidence from the rays.

Surface roughness is typically measured in microns, wavelength, or grit size, with ~80,000–100,000 grit or ~½λ–¼λ being "optical quality".

=== Transmissivity ===
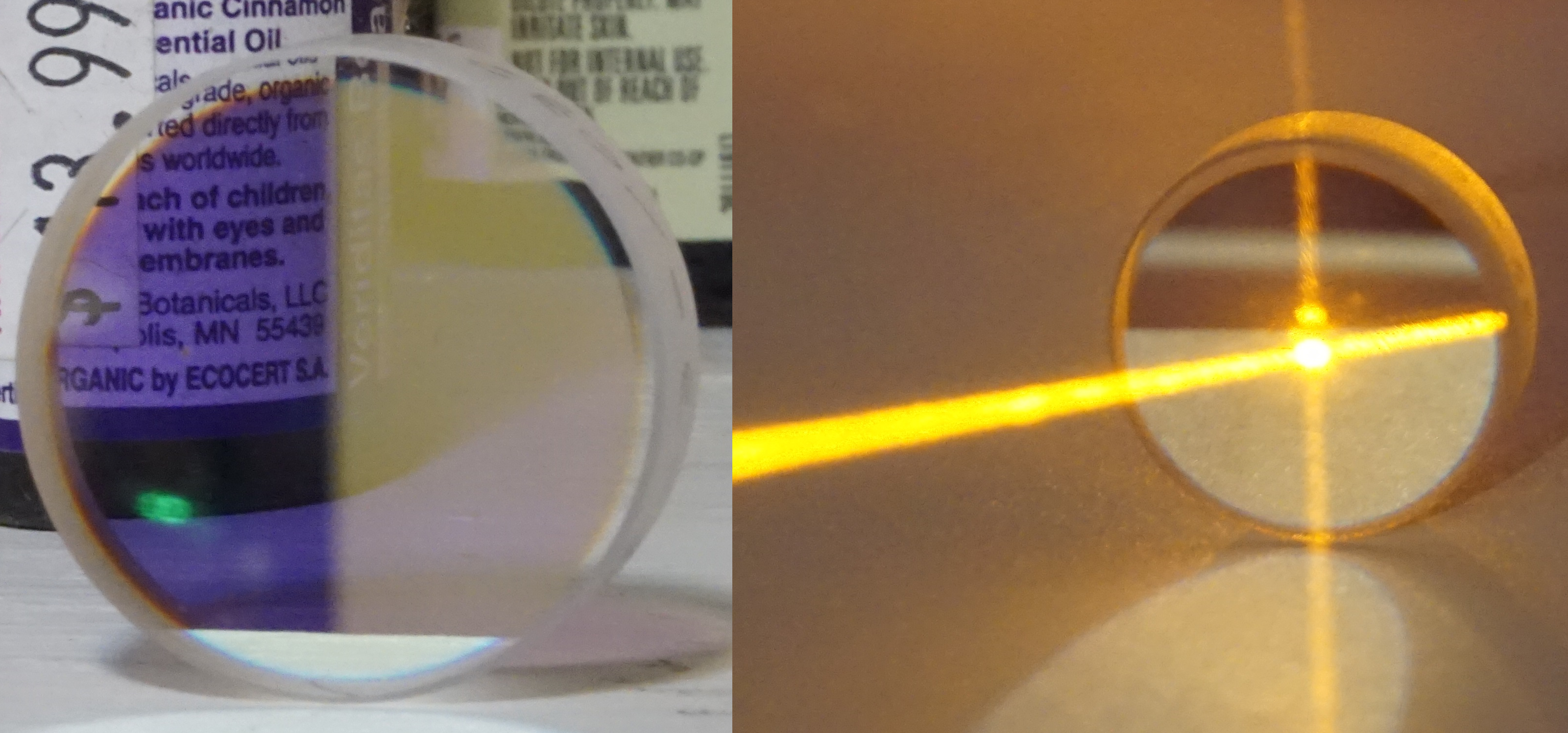
A dielectric, laser output-coupler that is 75–80% reflective between 500 and 600 nm, on a 3° wedge prism made of quartz glass. Left: The mirror is highly reflective to yellow and green but highly transmissive to red and blue. Right: The mirror transmits 25% of the 589 nm laser light. Because the smoke particles diffract more light than they reflect, the beam appears much brighter when reflecting back toward the observer.

Transmissivity is determined by the percentage of light transmitted per the incident light. Transmissivity is usually the same from both first and second surfaces. The combined transmitted and reflected light, subtracted from the incident light, measures the amount absorbed by both the coating and substrate. For transmissive mirrors, such as one-way mirrors, beam splitters, or laser output couplers, the transmissivity of the mirror is an important consideration. The transmissivity of metallic coatings are often determined by their thickness. For precision beam-splitters or output couplers, the thickness of the coating must be kept at very high tolerances to transmit the proper amount of light. For dielectric mirrors, the thickness of the coat must always be kept to high tolerances, but it is often more the number of individual coats that determine the transmissivity. For the substrate, the material used must also have good transmissivity to the chosen wavelengths. Glass is a suitable substrate for most visible-light applications, but other substrates such as zinc selenide or synthetic sapphire may be used for infrared or ultraviolet wavelengths.

=== Wedge ===
Wedge errors are caused by the deviation of the surfaces from perfect parallelism. An optical wedge is the angle formed between two plane-surfaces (or between the principle planes of curved surfaces) due to manufacturing errors or limitations, causing one edge of the mirror to be slightly thicker than the other. Nearly all mirrors and optics with parallel faces have some slight degree of wedge, which is usually measured in seconds or minutes of arc. For first-surface mirrors, wedges can introduce alignment deviations in mounting hardware. For second-surface or transmissive mirrors, wedges can have a prismatic effect on the light, deviating its trajectory or, to a very slight degree, its color, causing chromatic and other forms of aberration. In some instances, a slight wedge is desirable, such as in certain laser systems where stray reflections from the uncoated surface are better dispersed than reflected back through the medium.

=== Surface defects ===
Surface defects are small-scale, discontinuous imperfections in the surface smoothness. Surface defects are larger (in some cases much larger) than the surface roughness, but only affect small, localized portions of the entire surface. These are typically found as scratches, digs, pits (often from bubbles in the glass), sleeks (scratches from prior, larger grit polishing operations that were not fully removed by subsequent polishing grits), edge chips, or blemishes in the coating. These defects are often an unavoidable side-effect of manufacturing limitations, both in cost and machine precision. If kept low enough, in most applications these defects will rarely have any adverse effect, unless the surface is located at an image plane where they will show up directly. For applications that require extremely low scattering of light, extremely high reflectance, or low absorption due to high energy levels that could destroy the mirror, such as lasers or Fabry-Perot interferometers, the surface defects must be kept to a minimum.

== Manufacturing ==
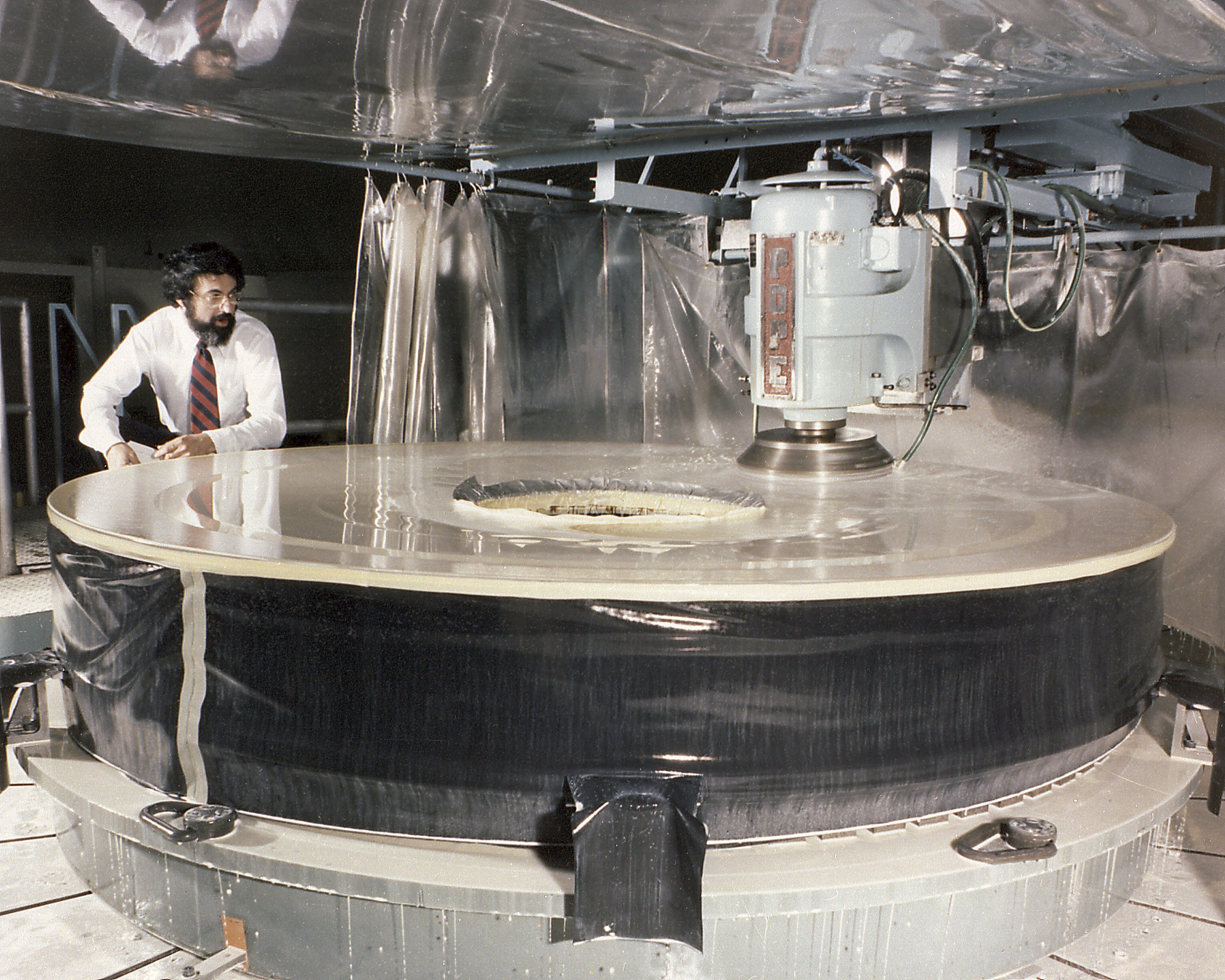
Polishing the primary mirror for the Hubble Space Telescope. A deviation in the surface quality of approximately 4λ resulted in poor images initially, which was eventually compensated for using corrective optics.

Mirrors are usually manufactured by either polishing a naturally reflective material, such as speculum metal, or by applying a reflective coating to a suitable polished substrate.

In some applications, generally those that are cost-sensitive or that require great durability, such as for mounting in a prison cell, mirrors may be made from a single, bulk material such as polished metal. However, metals consist of small crystals (grains) separated by grain boundaries that may prevent the surface from attaining optical smoothness and uniform reflectivity.

=== Coating ===
==== Silvering ====
The coating of glass with a reflective layer of a metal is generally called "silvering", even though the metal may not be silver. Currently the main processes are electroplating, "wet" chemical deposition, and vacuum deposition. Front-coated metal mirrors achieve reflectivities of 90–95% when new.

==== Dielectric coating ====
Applications requiring higher reflectivity or greater durability, where wide bandwidth is not essential, use dielectric coatings, which can achieve reflectivities as high as 99.997% over a limited range of wavelengths. Because they are often chemically stable and do not conduct electricity, dielectric coatings are almost always applied by methods of vacuum deposition, and most commonly by evaporation deposition. Because the coatings are usually transparent, absorption losses are negligible. Unlike with metals, the reflectivity of the individual dielectric-coatings is a function of Snell's law known as the Fresnel equations, determined by the difference in refractive index between layers. Therefore, the thickness and index of the coatings can be adjusted to be centered on any wavelength. Vacuum deposition can be achieved in a number of ways, including sputtering, evaporation deposition, arc deposition, reactive-gas deposition, and ion plating, among many others.

=== Shaping and polishing ===
==== Tolerances ====
Mirrors can be manufactured to a wide range of engineering tolerances, including reflectivity, surface quality, surface roughness, or transmissivity, depending on the desired application. These tolerances can range from wide, such as found in a normal household-mirror, to extremely narrow, like those used in lasers or telescopes. Tightening the tolerances allows better and more precise imaging or beam transmission over longer distances. In imaging systems this can help reduce anomalies (artifacts), distortion or blur, but at a much higher cost. Where viewing distances are relatively close or high precision is not a concern, wider tolerances can be used to make effective mirrors at affordable costs.

== Applications ==
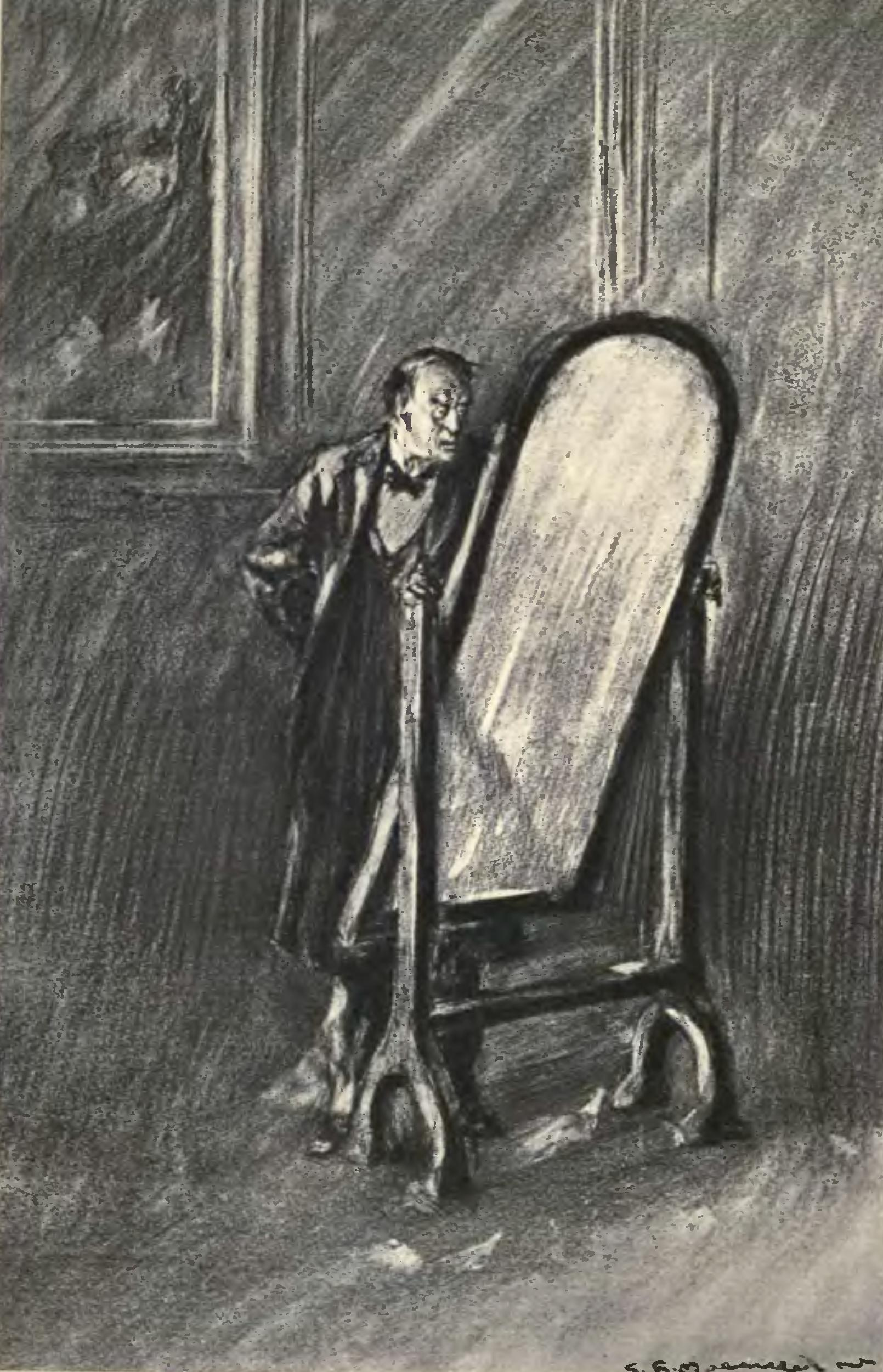
A cheval glass

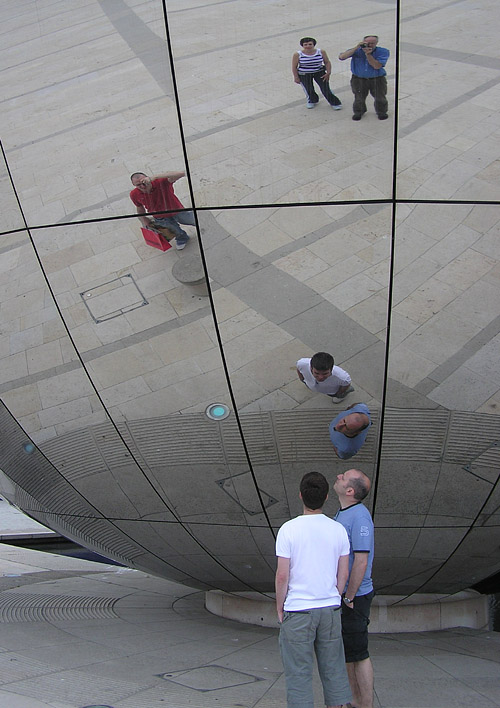
Reflections in a spherical convex mirror. The photographer is seen at top right.

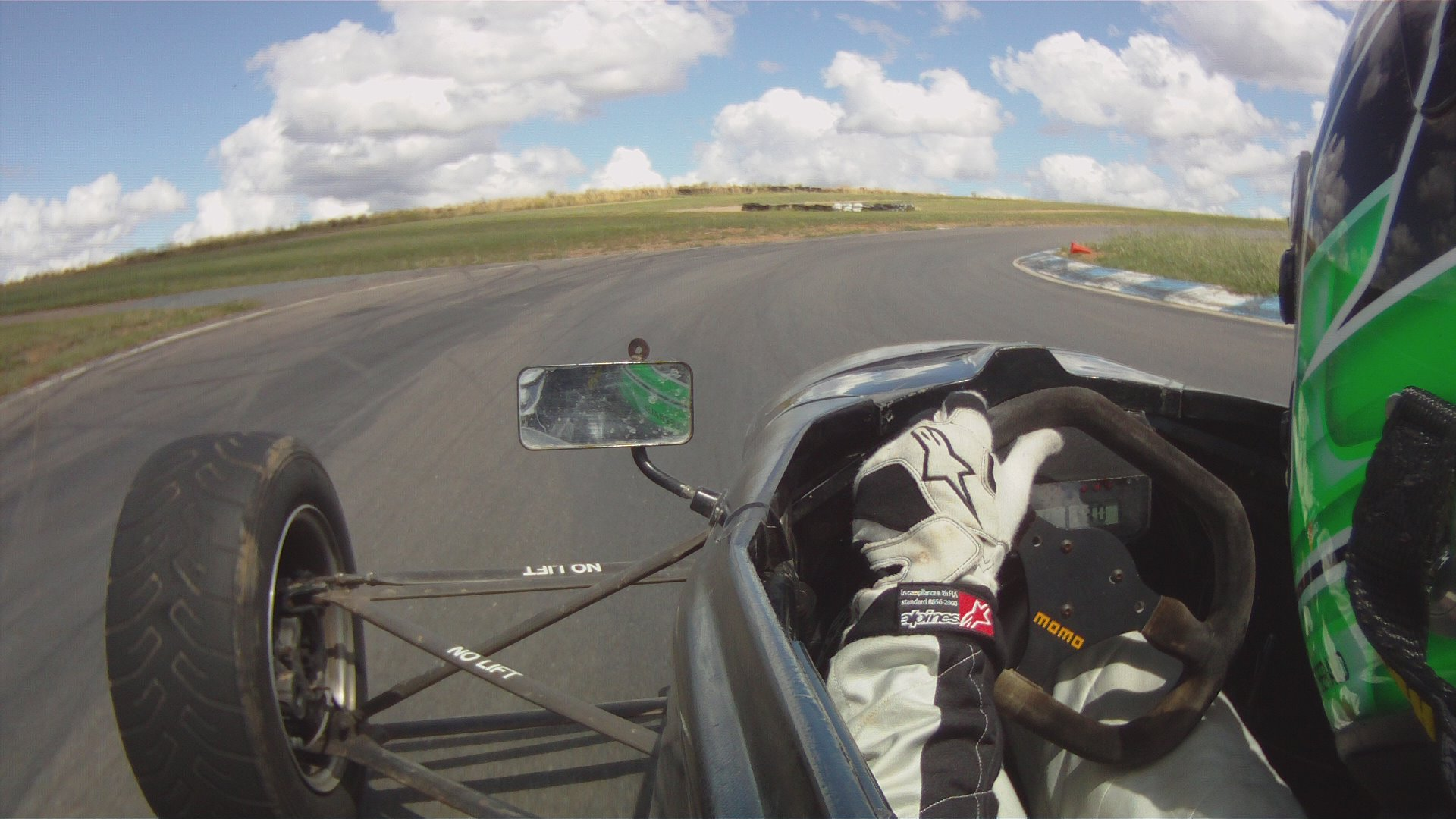
A side-mirror on a racing car

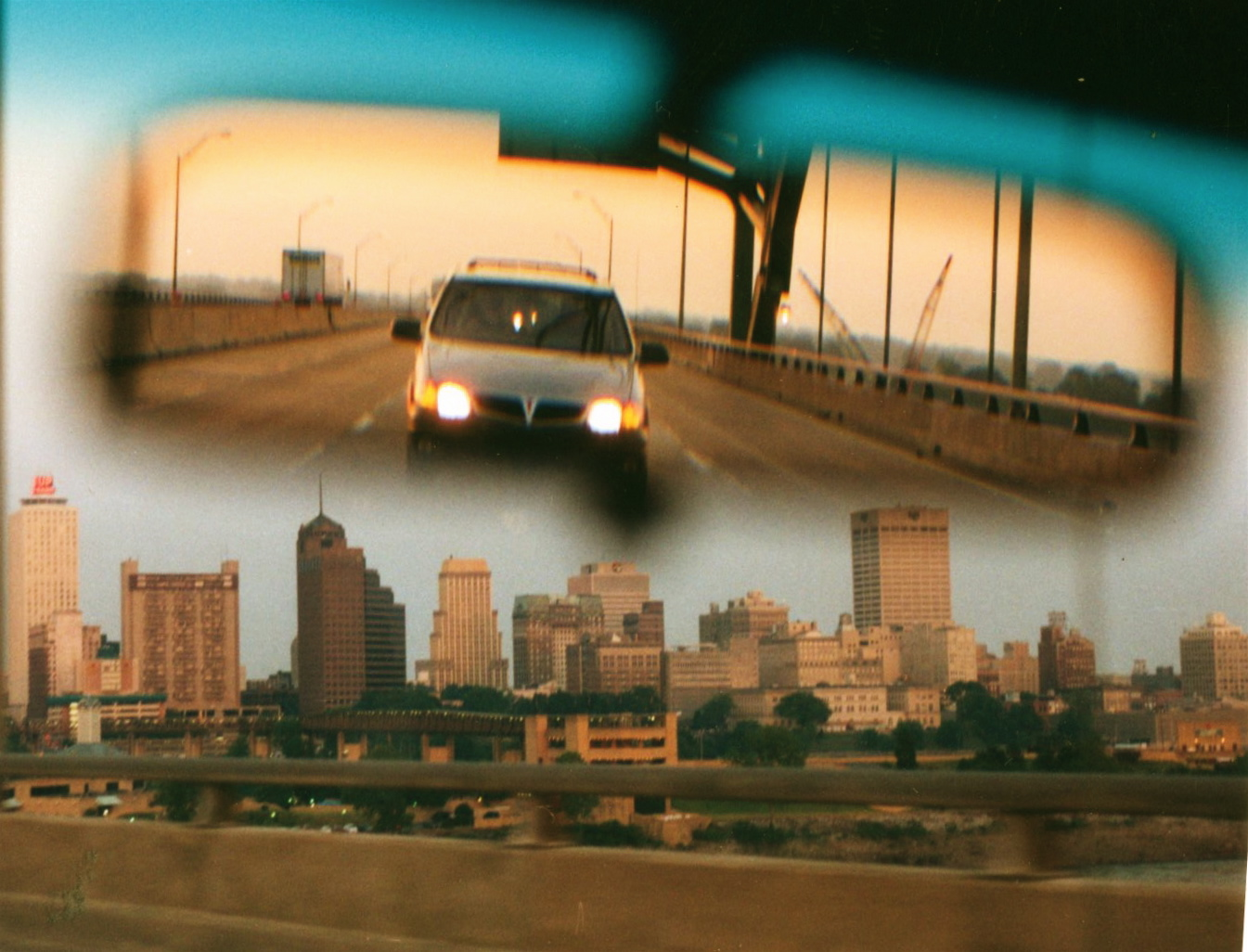
Rear-view mirror

A little girl is seeing her reflection on mirror

=== Personal grooming ===
Mirrors are commonly used as aids to personal grooming. They may range from small sizes (portable), to the size of a wall that they be affixed to. They may be handheld, mobile, fixed or adjustable. A classic example of an adjustable mirror is the cheval glass, which the user can tilt.

=== Safety and easier viewing ===
Convex mirrors

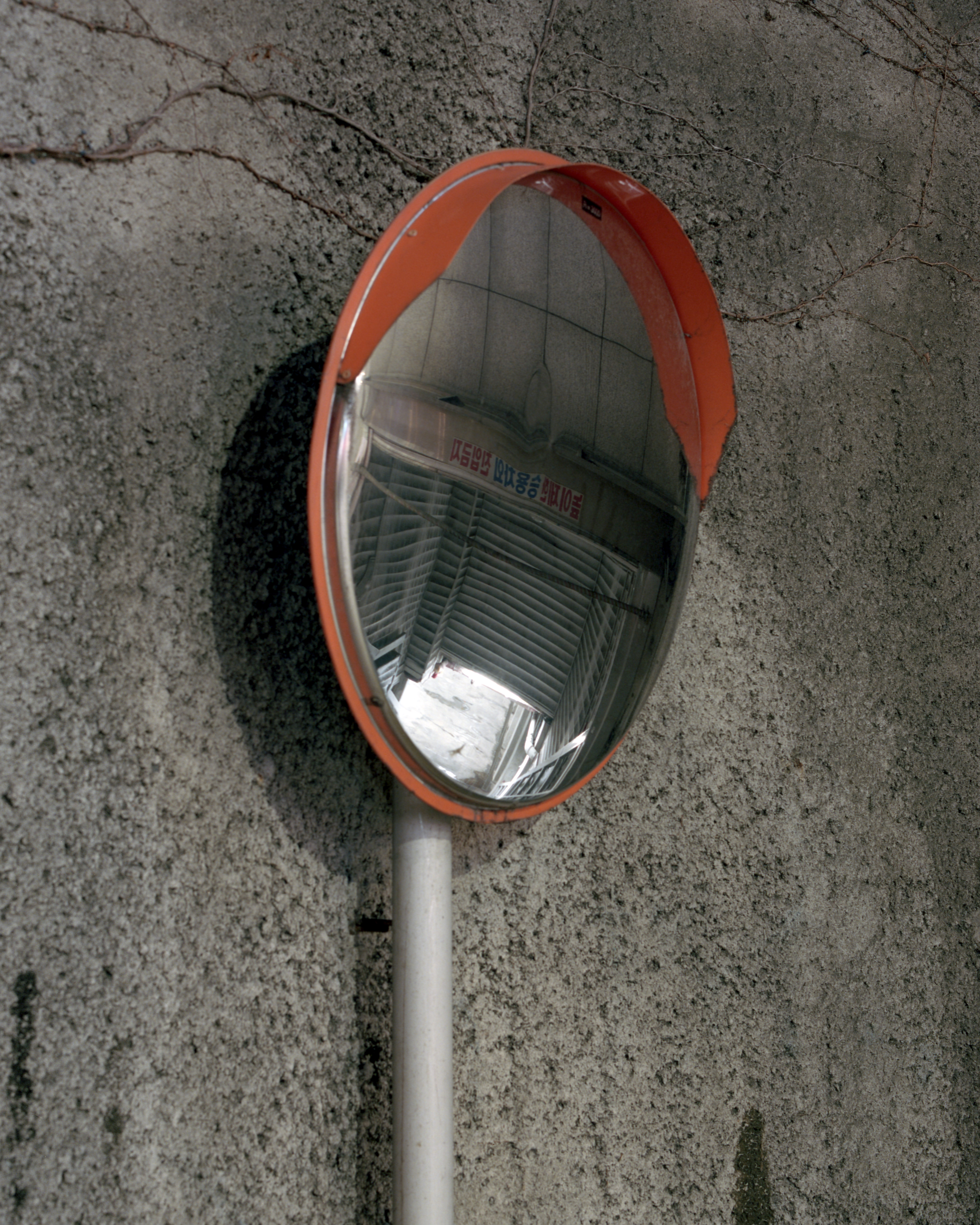
A convex mirror in a parking garage

Convex mirrors provide a wider field of view than flat mirrors, and are often used on vehicles, especially large trucks, to minimize blind spots. They are sometimes placed at road junctions, and at corners of sites such as parking lots to allow people to see around corners to avoid crashing into other vehicles or shopping carts. They are also sometimes used as part of security systems, so that a single video camera can show more than one angle at a time. Convex mirrors as decoration are used in interior design to provide a predominantly experiential effect.

Mouth mirrors or "dental mirrors"
Dentists use mouth mirrors or "dental mirrors" to allow indirect vision and lighting within the mouth. Their reflective surfaces may be either flat or curved. Mouth mirrors are also commonly used by mechanics to allow vision in tight spaces and around corners in equipment.
Rear-view mirrors
Rear-view mirrors are widely used in and on vehicles (such as automobiles, or bicycles), to allow drivers to see other vehicles coming up behind them. On rear-view sunglasses, the left end of the left glass and the right end of the right glass work as mirrors.

=== One-way mirrors and windows ===
One-way mirrors
One-way mirrors (also called two-way mirrors) work by overwhelming dim transmitted light with bright reflected light. A true one-way mirror that actually allows light to be transmitted in one direction only without requiring external energy is not possible as it violates the second law of thermodynamics.
One-way windows
One-way windows can be made to work with polarized light in the laboratory without violating the second law. This is an apparent paradox that stumped some great physicists, although it does not allow a practical one-way mirror for use in the real world. Optical isolators are one-way devices that are commonly used with lasers.

=== Signalling ===
With the sun as the light source, a mirror can be used to signal by variations in the orientation of the mirror. The signal can be used over long distances, possibly up to 60 kilometres (37 mi) on a clear day. Native American tribes and numerous militaries used this technique to transmit information between distant outposts.

Mirrors can also be used to attract the attention of search-and-rescue parties. Specialized types of daylight signalling mirrors are available and are often included in military survival kits.

=== Technology ===
==== Televisions and projectors ====
Microscopic mirrors are a core element of many of the largest high-definition televisions and video projectors. A common technology of this type is Texas Instruments' DLP. A DLP chip is a postage stamp-sized microchip whose surface is an array of millions of microscopic mirrors. The picture is created as the individual mirrors move to either reflect light toward the projection surface (pixel on), or toward a light-absorbing surface (pixel off).

Other projection technologies involving mirrors include LCoS. Like a DLP chip, LCoS is a microchip of similar size, but rather than millions of individual mirrors, there is a single mirror that is actively shielded by a liquid crystal matrix with up to millions of pixels. The picture, formed as light, is either reflected toward the projection surface (pixel on), or absorbed by the activated LCD pixels (pixel off). LCoS-based televisions and projectors often use 3 chips, one for each primary color.

Large mirrors are used in rear-projection televisions. Light (for example from a DLP as discussed above) is "folded" by one or more mirrors so that the television set is compact.

==== Optical discs ====
Optical discs are modified mirrors which encode binary data as a series of physical pits and lands on an inner layer between the metal backing and outer plastic surface. The data is read and decoded by observing distortions in a reflected laser beam caused by the physical variations in the inner layer. Optical discs typically use aluminum backing like conventional mirrors, though ones with silver and gold backings also exist.

==== Solar power ====
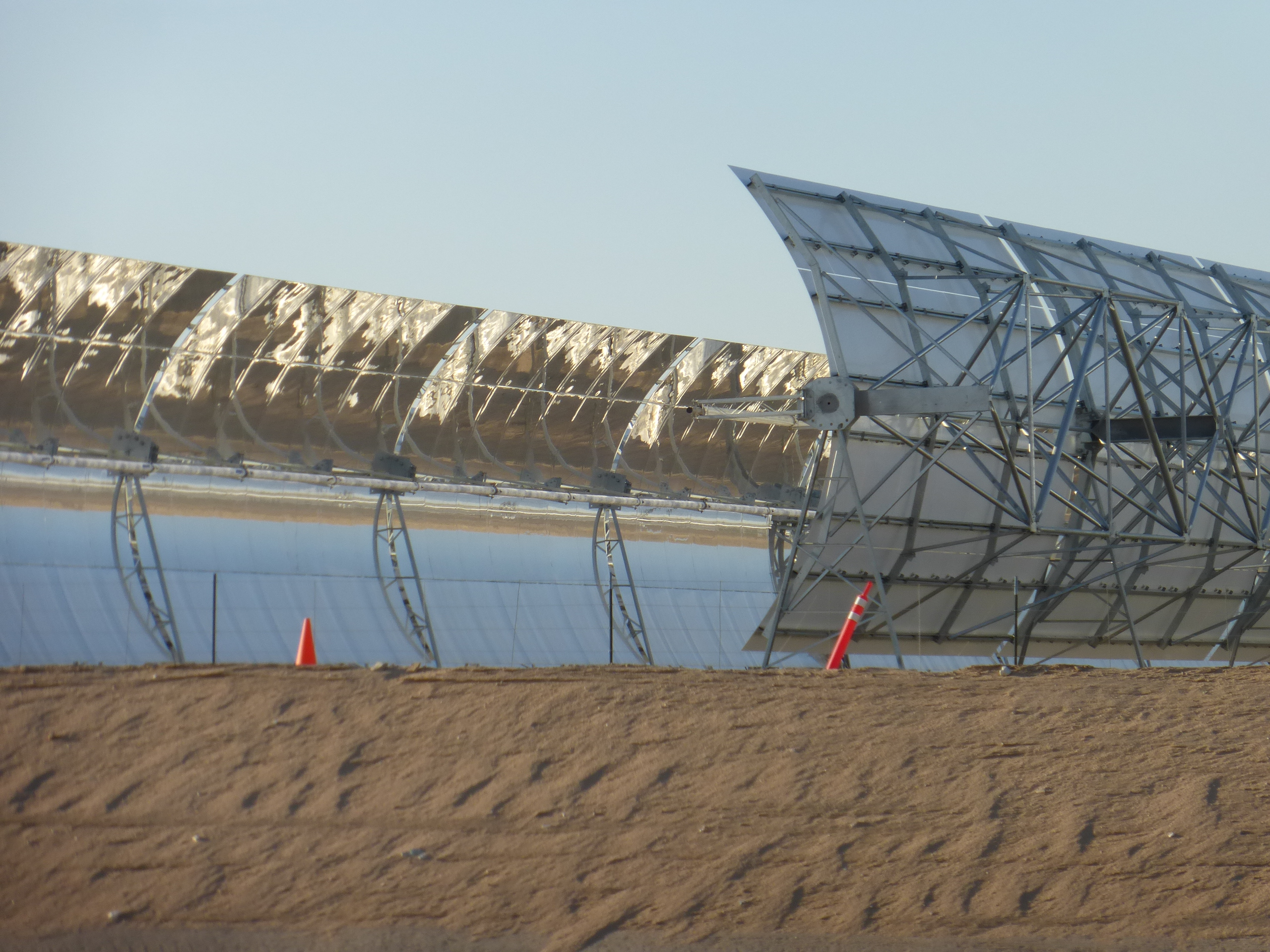
Parabolic troughs near Harper Lake in California

Mirrors are integral parts of a solar power plant. The one shown in the adjacent picture uses concentrated solar power from an array of parabolic troughs.

==== Instruments ====
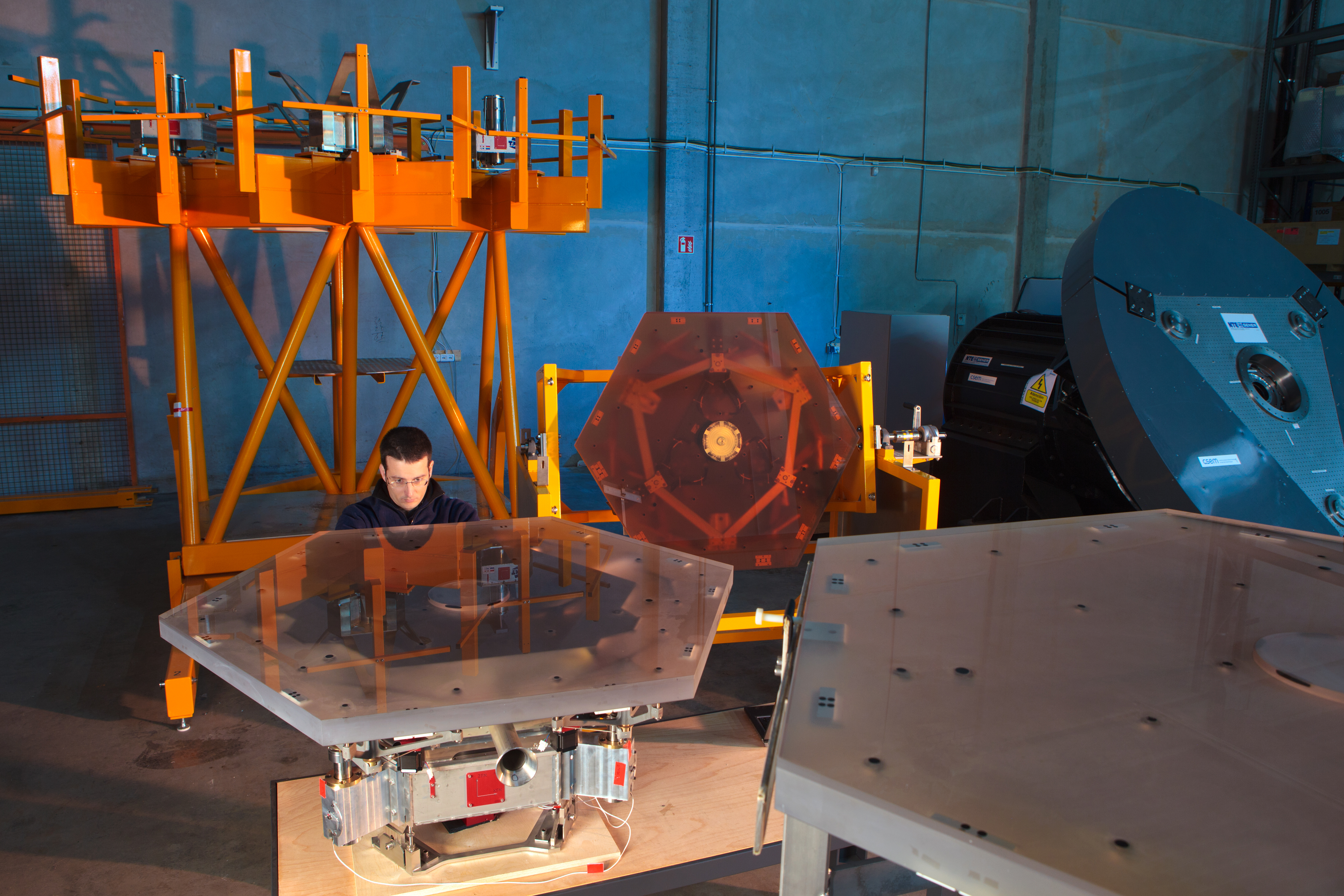
E-ELT mirror segments under test

Telescopes and other precision instruments use front silvered or first surface mirrors, where the reflecting surface is placed on the front (or first) surface of the glass (this eliminates reflection from glass surface ordinary back mirrors have). Some of them use silver, but most are aluminium, which is more reflective at short wavelengths than silver. All of these coatings are easily damaged and require special handling. They reflect 90% to 95% of the incident light when new. The coatings are typically applied by vacuum deposition. A protective overcoat is usually applied before the mirror is removed from the vacuum, because the coating otherwise begins to corrode as soon as it is exposed to oxygen and humidity in air. Front silvered mirrors have to be resurfaced occasionally to maintain their quality. There are optical mirrors such as mangin mirrors that are second surface mirrors (reflective coating on the rear surface) as part of their optical designs, usually to correct optical aberrations.

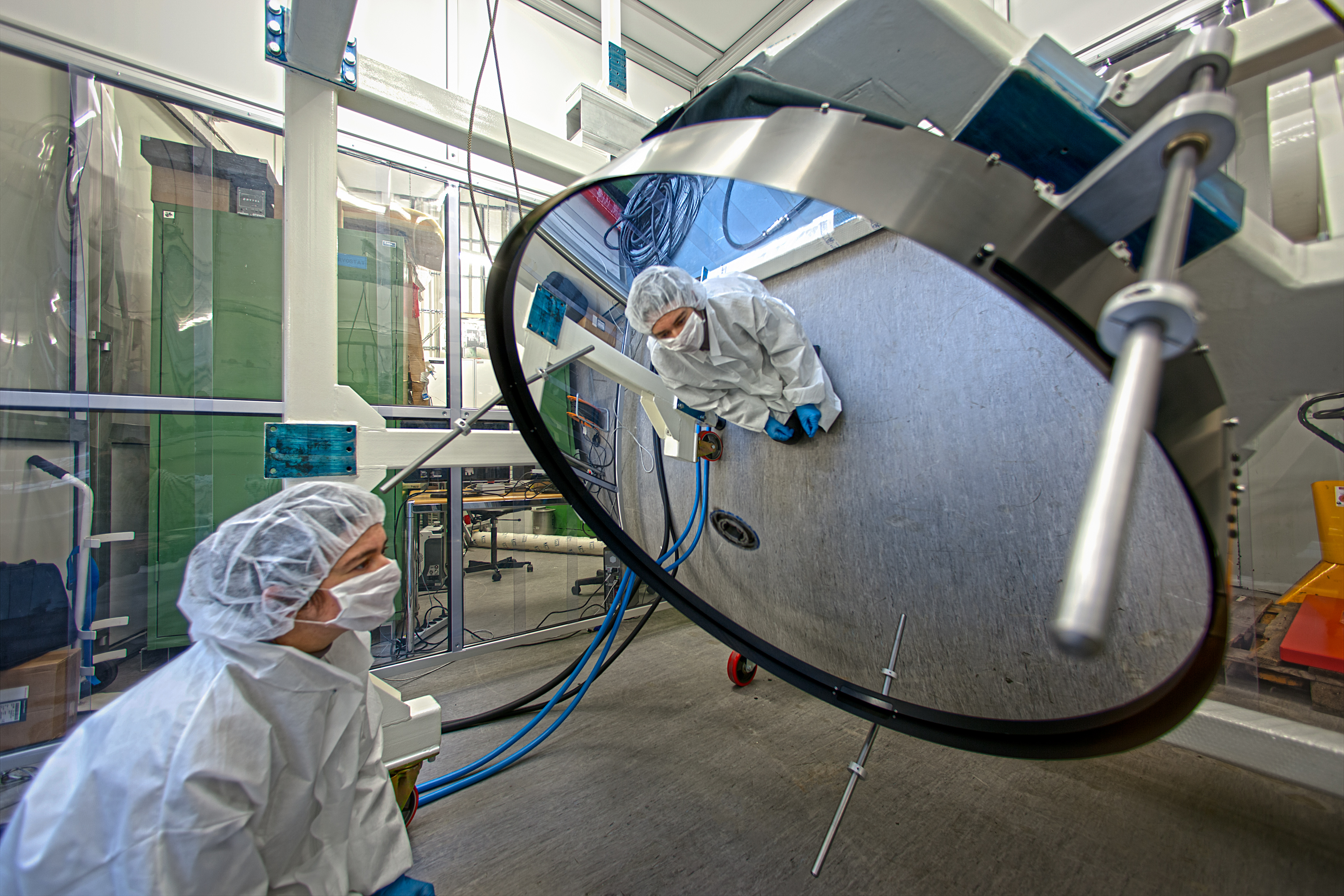
Deformable thin-shell mirror. It is 1120 millimetres across but just 2 millimetres thick, making it much thinner than most glass windows.

The reflectivity of the mirror coating can be measured using a reflectometer and for a particular metal it will be different for different wavelengths of light. This is exploited in some optical work to make cold mirrors and hot mirrors. A cold mirror is made by using a transparent substrate and choosing a coating material that is more reflective to visible light and more transmissive to infrared light.

A hot mirror is the opposite, the coating preferentially reflects infrared. Mirror surfaces are sometimes given thin film overcoatings both to retard degradation of the surface and to increase their reflectivity in parts of the spectrum where they will be used. For instance, aluminium mirrors are commonly coated with silicon dioxide or magnesium fluoride. The reflectivity as a function of wavelength depends on both the thickness of the coating and on how it is applied.

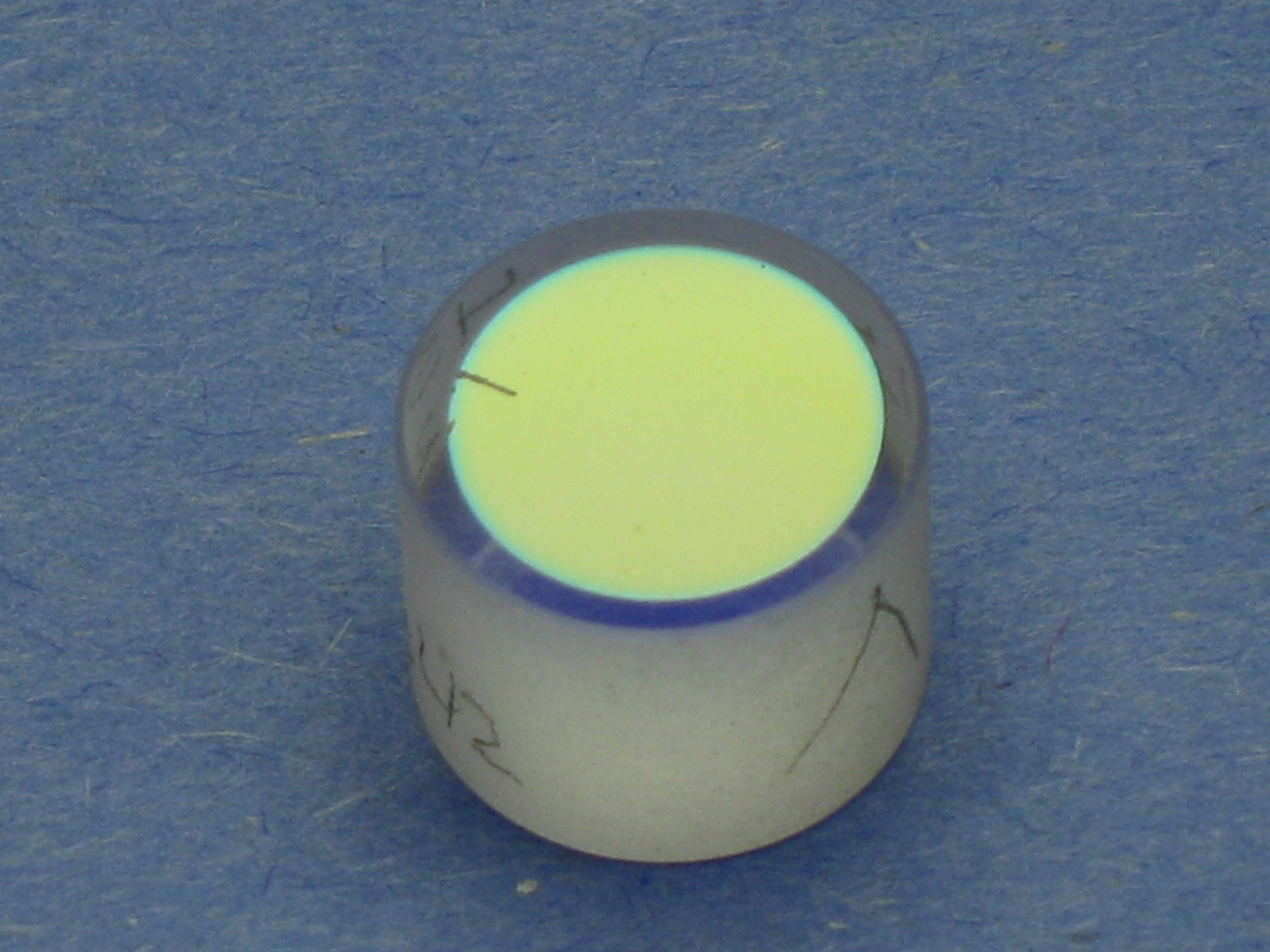
A dielectric coated mirror used in a dye laser. The mirror is over 99% reflective at 550 nanometers, (yellow), but will allow most other colors to pass through.

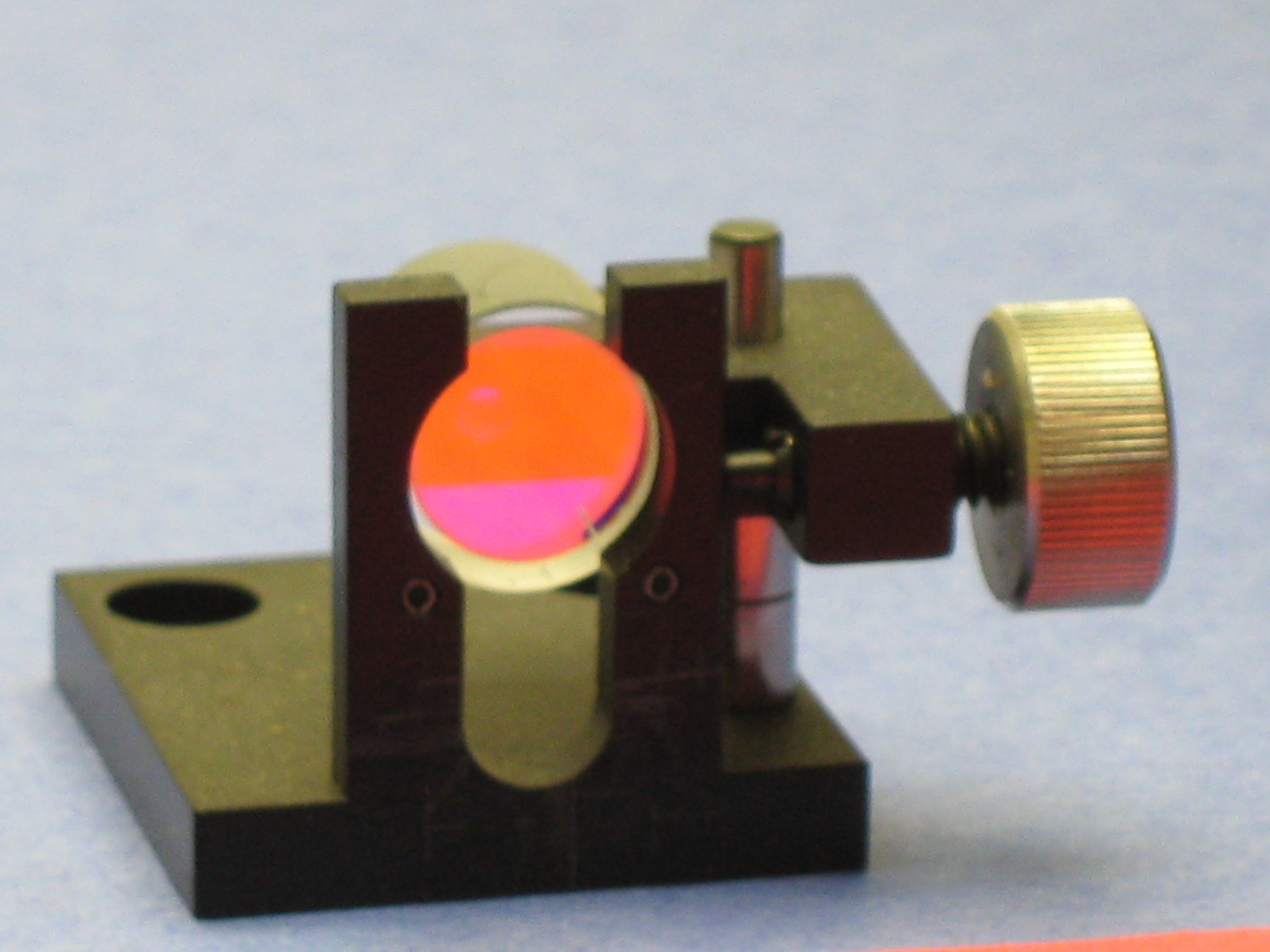
A dielectric mirror used in tunable lasers. With a center wavelength of 600 nm and bandwidth of 100 nm, the coating is totally reflective to the orange construction paper, but only reflects the reddish hues from the blue paper.

For scientific optical work, dielectric mirrors are often used. These are glass (or sometimes other material) substrates on which one or more layers of dielectric material are deposited, to form an optical coating. By careful choice of the type and thickness of the dielectric layers, the range of wavelengths and amount of light reflected from the mirror can be specified. The best mirrors of this type can reflect >99.999% of the light (in a narrow range of wavelengths) which is incident on the mirror. Such mirrors are often used in lasers.

In astronomy, adaptive optics is a technique to measure variable image distortions and adapt a deformable mirror accordingly on a timescale of milliseconds, to compensate for the distortions.

Although most mirrors are designed to reflect visible light, surfaces reflecting other forms of electromagnetic radiation are also called "mirrors". The mirrors for other ranges of electromagnetic waves are used in optics and astronomy. Mirrors for radio waves (sometimes known as reflectors) are important elements of radio telescopes.

Simple periscopes use mirrors.

==== Face-to-face mirrors ====
Two or more mirrors aligned exactly parallel and facing each other can give an infinite regress of reflections, called an infinity mirror effect. Some devices use this to generate multiple reflections:

- Fabry–Pérot interferometer
- Laser (which contains an optical cavity)
- 3D kaleidoscope to concentrate light
- momentum-enhanced solar sail

==== Military applications ====
Tradition states that Archimedes used a large array of mirrors to burn Roman ships during an attack on Syracuse. This has never been proven or disproved. On the TV show MythBusters, a team from MIT tried to recreate the famous "Archimedes Death Ray". They were unsuccessful at starting a fire on a ship. Previous attempts to set a boat on fire using only the bronze mirrors available in Archimedes' time were unsuccessful, and the time taken to ignite the craft would have made its use impractical, resulting in the MythBusters team deeming the myth "busted". It was however found that the mirrors made it very difficult for the passengers of the targeted boat to see; such a scenario could have impeded attackers and have provided the origin of the legend. (See solar power tower for a practical use of this technique.)

Periscopes were used to great effect in war, especially during the World Wars where they were used to peer over the parapet of trenches to ensure that the soldier using the periscope could see safely without the risk of incoming direct fire from other small arms.

==== Seasonal lighting ====
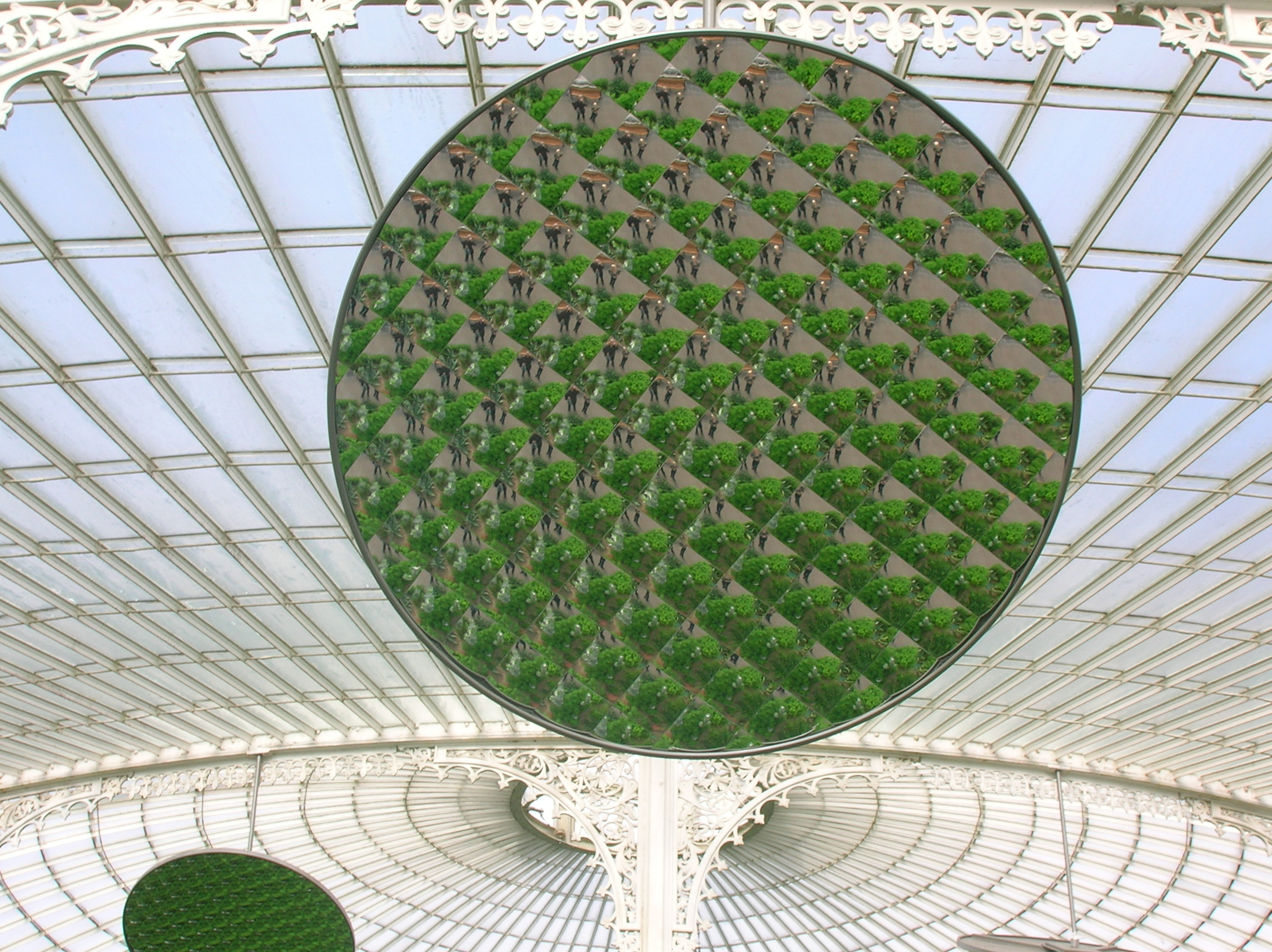
A multi-facet mirror in the Kibble Palace conservatory, Glasgow, Scotland

Due to its location in a steep-sided valley, the Italian town of Viganella gets no direct sunlight for seven weeks each winter. In 2006 a €100,000 computer-controlled mirror, 8×5 m, was installed to reflect sunlight into the town's piazza. In early 2007 the similarly situated village of Bondo, Switzerland, was considering applying this solution as well. In 2013, mirrors were installed to reflect sunlight into the town square in the Norwegian town of Rjukan. Mirrors can be used to produce enhanced lighting effects in greenhouses or conservatories.

=== Architecture ===
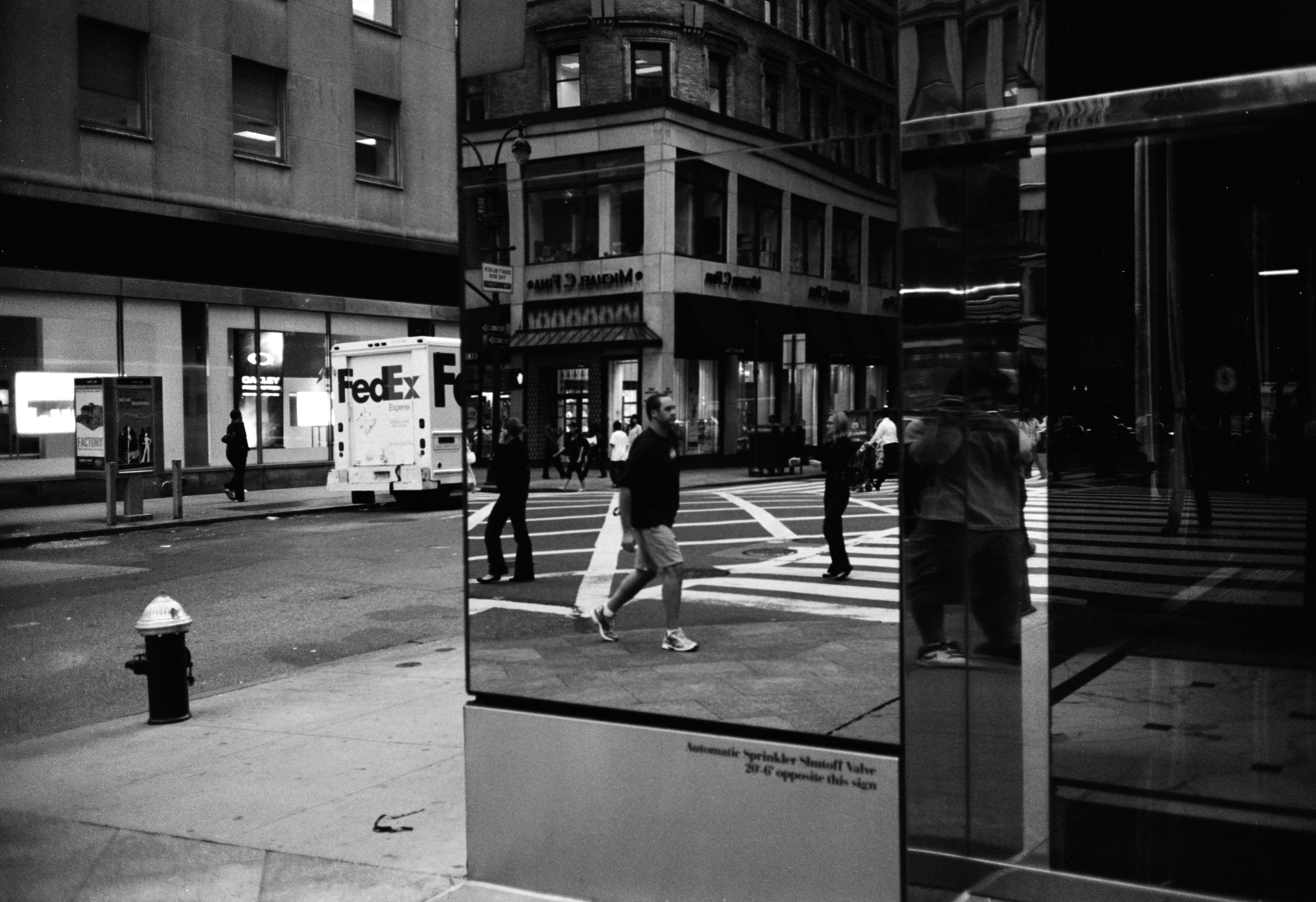
Mirrored building in Manhattan - 2008

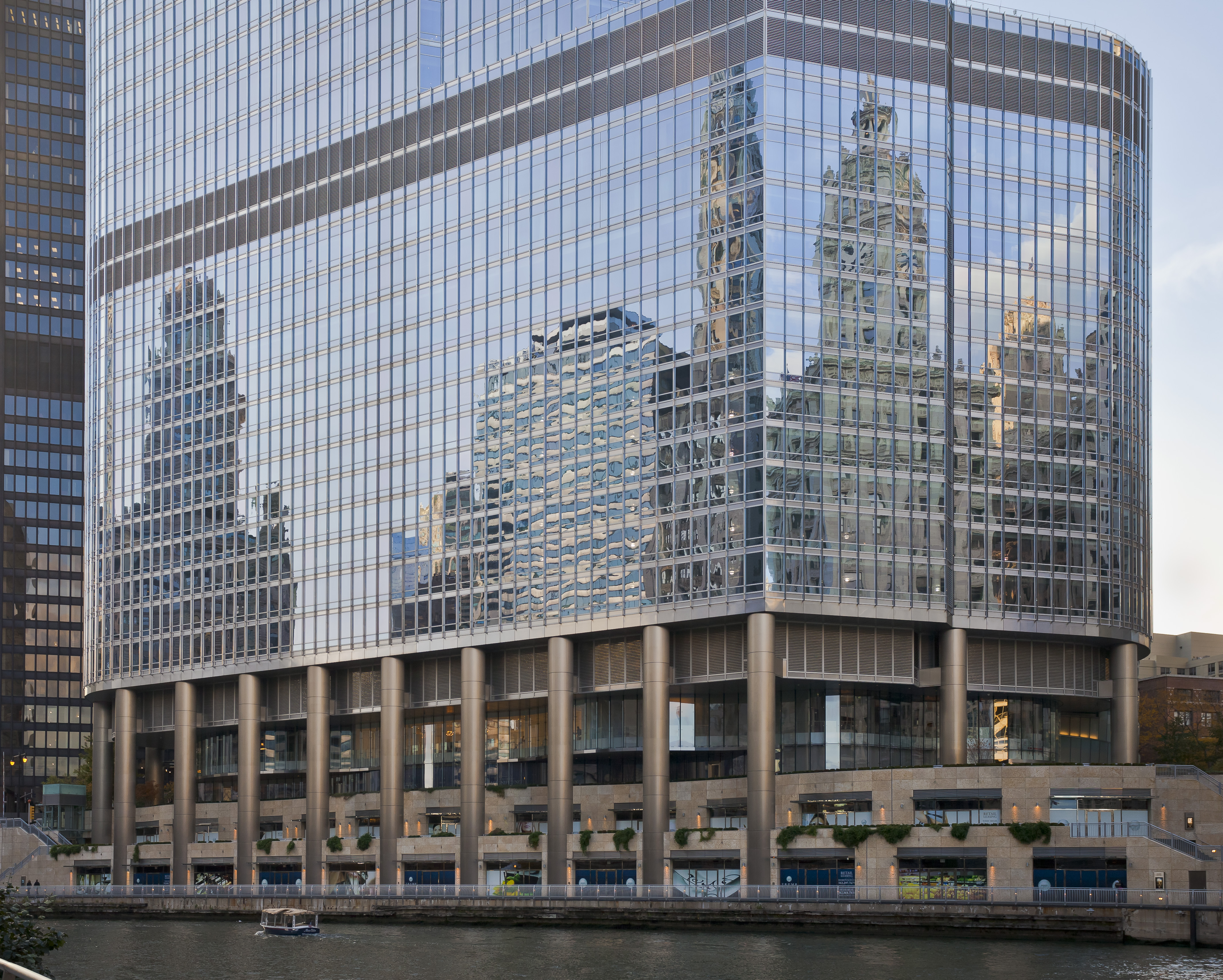
401 N. Wabash Ave. reflects the skyline along the Chicago River in downtown Chicago

Mirrors are a popular design-theme in architecture, particularly with late modern and post-modernist high-rise buildings in major cities. Early examples include the Campbell Center in Dallas, which opened in 1972, and the John Hancock Tower (completed in 1976) in Boston.

More recently, two skyscrapers designed by architect Rafael Viñoly, the Vdara in Las Vegas and 20 Fenchurch Street in London, have experienced unusual problems due to their concave curved-glass exteriors acting as respectively cylindrical and spherical reflectors for sunlight. In 2010, the Las Vegas Review Journal reported that sunlight reflected off the Vdara's south-facing tower could singe swimmers in the hotel pool, as well as melting plastic cups and shopping bags; employees of the hotel referred to the phenomenon as the "Vdara death ray", aka the "fryscraper." In 2013, sunlight reflecting off 20 Fenchurch Street melted parts of a Jaguar car parked nearby and scorching or igniting the carpet of a nearby barber-shop. This building had been nicknamed the "walkie-talkie" because its shape was supposedly similar to a certain model of two-way radio; but after its tendency to overheat surrounding objects became known, the nickname changed to the "walkie-scorchie".

=== Fine art ===
==== Paintings ====
Titian's Venus with a Mirror

Painters depicting someone gazing into a mirror often also show the person's reflection. This is a kind of abstraction—in most cases the angle of view is such that the person's reflection should not be visible. Similarly, in movies and still photography an actor or actress is often shown ostensibly looking at him- or herself in a mirror, and yet the reflection faces the camera. In reality, the actor or actress sees only the camera and its operator in this case, not their own reflection. In the psychology of perception, this is known as the Venus effect.

The mirror is the central device in some of the greatest of European paintings:

- Édouard Manet's A Bar at the Folies-Bergère (1882)
- Titian's Venus with a Mirror
- Jan van Eyck's Arnolfini Portrait (1434)
- Pablo Picasso's Girl before a Mirror (1932)
- Diego Velázquez's Rokeby Venus
- Diego Velázquez's Las Meninas (wherein the viewer is both the watcher - of a self-portrait in progress - and the watched) and the many adaptations of that painting in various media
- Veronese's Venus with a Mirror

Artists have used mirrors to create works and to hone their craft:

- Filippo Brunelleschi discovered linear perspective with the help of the mirror.
- Leonardo da Vinci called the mirror the "master of painters". He recommended, "When you wish to see whether your whole picture accords with what you have portrayed from nature take a mirror and reflect the actual object in it. Compare what is reflected with your painting and carefully consider whether both likenesses of the subject correspond, particularly in regard to the mirror."
- Many self-portraits are made possible through the use of mirrors, such as great self-portraits by Dürer, Frida Kahlo, Rembrandt, and Van Gogh. M. C. Escher used special shapes of mirrors in order to achieve a much more complete view of his surroundings than by direct observation in Hand with Reflecting Sphere (1935; also known as Self-Portrait in Spherical Mirror).

Mirrors are sometimes necessary to fully appreciate art work:

- István Orosz's anamorphic works are images distorted such that they only become clearly visible when reflected in a suitably shaped and positioned mirror.

==== Sculpture ====
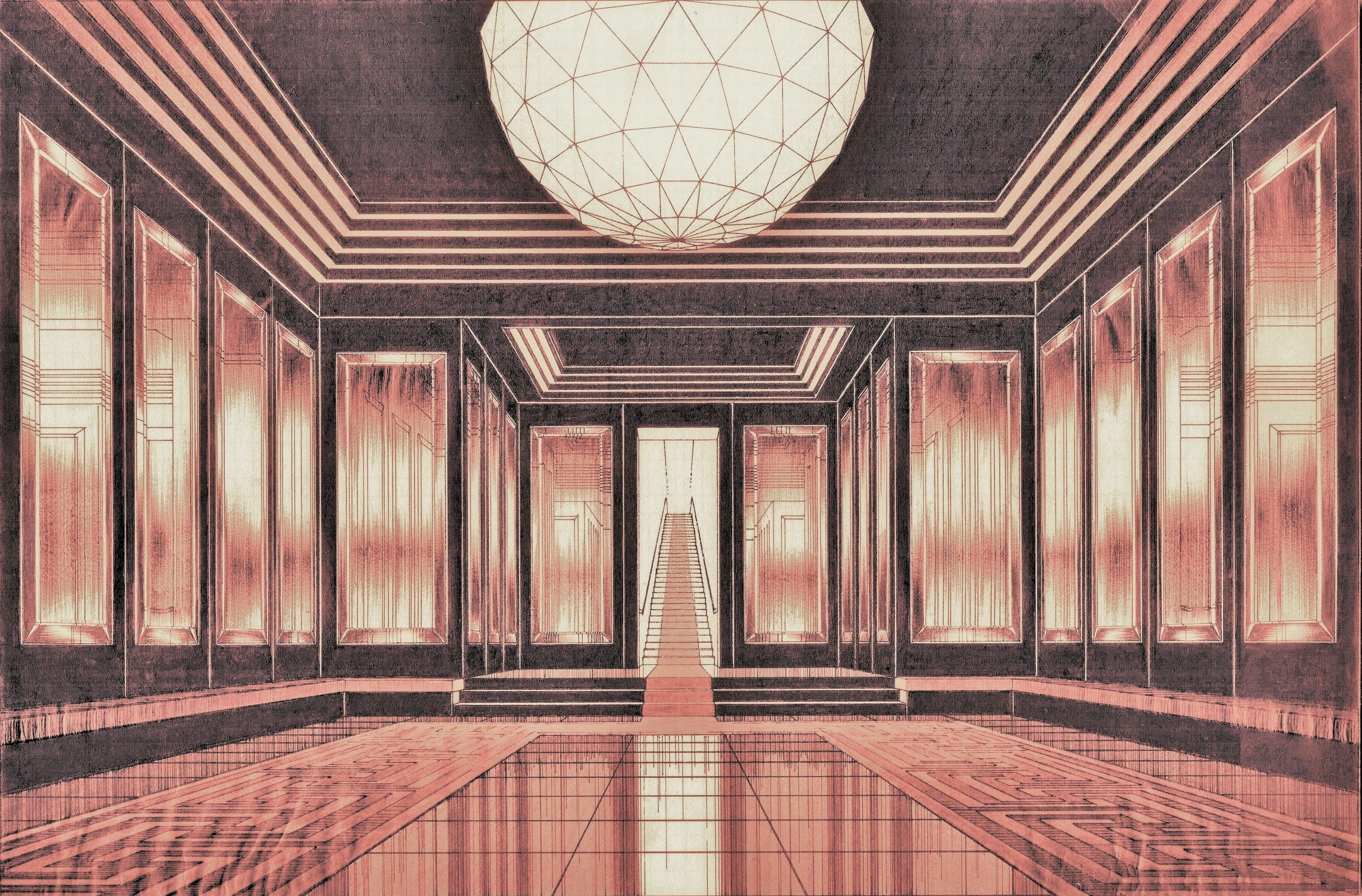
Mirrors in interior design: "Waiting room in the house of M.me B.", Art Deco project by Italian architect Arnaldo dell'Ira, Rome, 1939.

- Anamorphosis projecting sculpture into mirrors

Contemporary anamorphic artist Jonty Hurwitz uses cylindrical mirrors to project distorted sculptures.

- Sculptures comprised entirely or in part of mirrors include:
  - Infinity Also Hurts, a mirror, glass and silicone sculpture by artist Seth Wulsin
  - Sky Mirror, a public sculpture by artist Anish Kapoor

==== Other artistic mediums ====
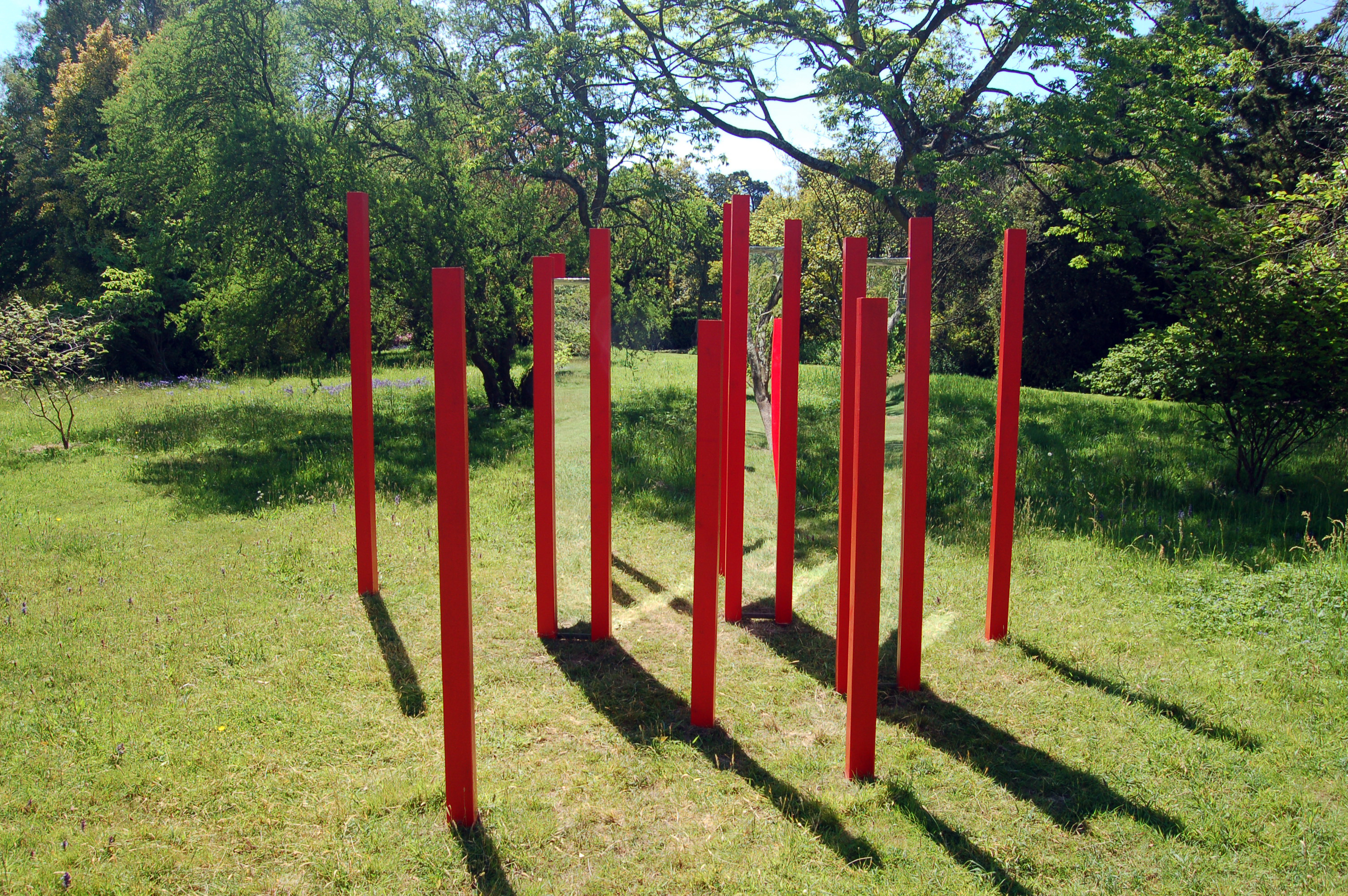
Grove Of Mirrors by Hilary Arnold Baker, Romsey

Some other contemporary artists use mirrors as the material of art:

- A Chinese magic mirror is a device in which the face of the bronze mirror projects the same image that was cast on its back. This is due to minute curvatures on its front.
- Specular holography uses a large number of curved mirrors embedded in a surface to produce three-dimensional imagery.
- Paintings on mirror surfaces (such as silkscreen printed glass mirrors)
- Special mirror installations:
  - Follow Me, a mirror labyrinth by artist Jeppe Hein (see also, Entertainment: Mirror mazes, below)
  - Mirror Neon Cube by artist Jeppe Hein

==== Religious function of the real and depicted mirror ====
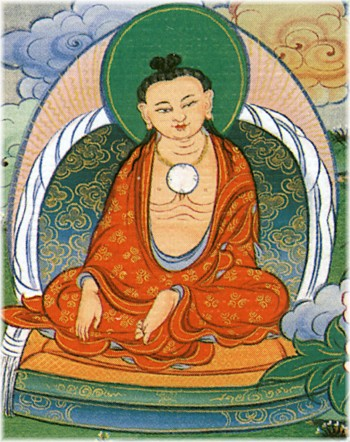
Drubthob Melong Dorje (1243–1303), a lineage holder of the Vima Nyingtik, depicted wearing a mirror hanging from his neck

In the Middle Ages, mirrors existed in various shapes for multiple uses. Mostly they were used as an accessory for personal hygiene but also as tokens of courtly love, made from ivory in the ivory-carving centers in Paris, Cologne and the Southern Netherlands. They also had their uses in religious contexts as they were integrated in a special form of pilgrim badges or pewter/lead mirror boxes From the late 14th century. Burgundian ducal inventories show us that the dukes owned a mass of mirrors or objects with mirrors, not only with religious iconography or inscriptions, but combined with reliquaries, religious paintings or other objects that were distinctively used for personal piety. Considering mirrors in paintings and book illumination as depicted artifacts and trying to draw conclusions about their functions from their setting, one of these functions is to be an aid in personal prayer to achieve self-knowledge and knowledge of God, in accord with contemporary theological sources. For example, the famous Arnolfini Wedding by Jan van Eyck shows a constellation of objects that can be recognized as one which would allow a praying man to use them for his personal piety: the mirror surrounded by scenes of the Passion to reflect on it and on oneself, a rosary as a device in this process, the veiled and cushioned bench to use as a prie-dieu, and the abandoned shoes that point in the direction in which the praying man kneeled. The metaphorical meaning of depicted mirrors is complex and many-layered, e.g. as an attribute of Mary, the "speculum sine macula" (mirror without blemish), or as attributes of scholarly and theological wisdom and knowledge as they appear in book illuminations of different evangelists and authors of theological treatises. Depicted mirrors – orientated on the physical properties of a real mirror – can be seen as metaphors of knowledge and reflection and are thus able to remind beholders to reflect and get to know themselves. The mirror may function simultaneously as a symbol and as a device of a moral appeal. That is also the case if it is shown in combination with virtues and vices, a combination which also occurs more frequently in the 15th century: the moralizing layers of mirror metaphors remind the beholder to examine themself thoroughly according to their own virtuous or vicious life. This is all the more true if the mirror is combined with iconography of death. Not only is Death as a corpse or skeleton holding the mirror for the still-living personnel of paintings, illuminations and prints, but the skull appears on the convex surfaces of depicted mirrors, showing the painted and real beholders their future face.

=== Decoration ===
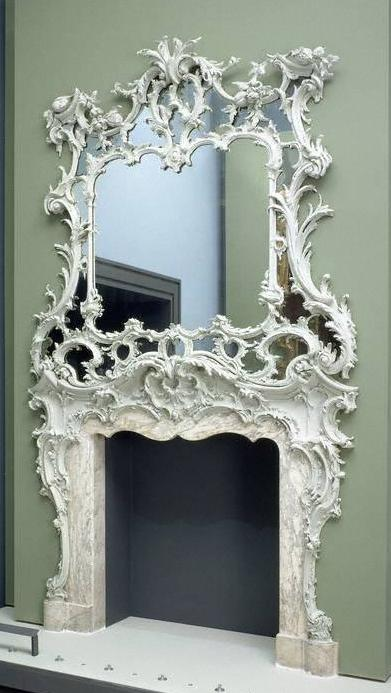
Chimneypiece and overmantel mirror, c. 1750 V&A Museum no. 738:1 to 3–1897

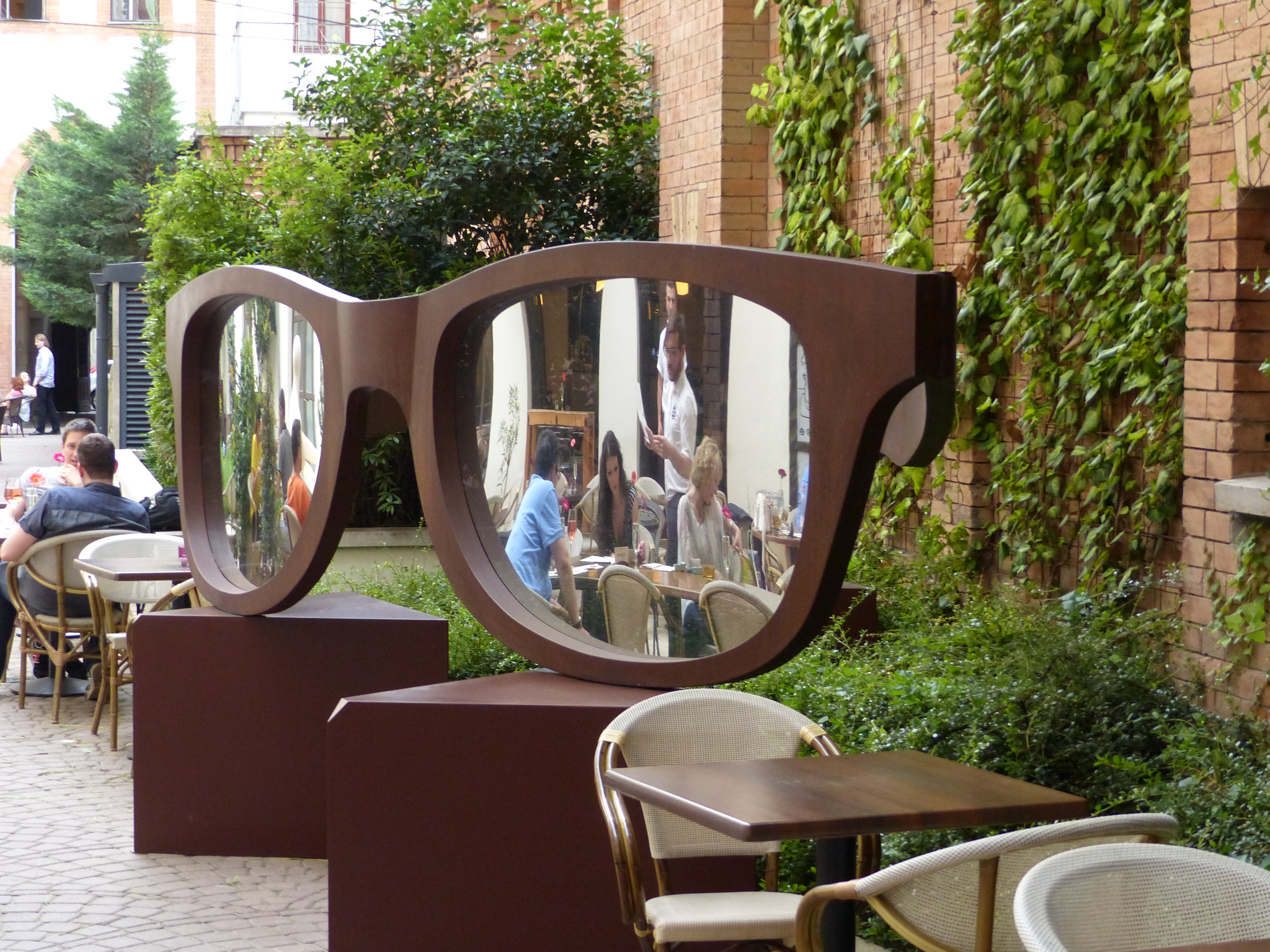
Glasses with mirrors – Prezi HQ

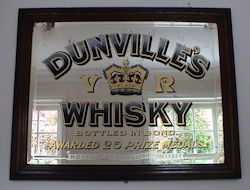
A bar mirror bearing the logo of Dunville's Whiskey.

Mirrors are frequently used in interior decoration and as ornaments:

- Mirrors, typically large and unframed, are frequently used in interior decoration to create an illusion of space and to amplify the apparent size of a room. They come also framed in a variety of forms, such as the pier glass and the overmantel mirror.
- Mirrors are used also in some schools of feng shui, an ancient Chinese practice of placement and arrangement of space to achieve harmony with an environment.
- The softness of old mirrors is sometimes replicated by contemporary artisans for use in interior design. These reproduction antiqued mirrors are works of art and can bring color and texture to an otherwise hard, cold reflective surface.
- A decorative reflecting sphere of thin metal-coated glass, working as a reducing wide-angle mirror, is sold as a Christmas ornament called a bauble.
- Some pubs and bars hang mirrors depicting the logo of a brand of liquor, beer or drinking establishment.

=== Entertainment ===
- Illuminated rotating disco balls covered with small mirrors are used to cast moving spots of light around a dance floor.
- The hall of mirrors, commonly found in amusement parks, is an attraction in which a number of distorting mirrors produce unusual reflections of the visitor.
- Mirrors are employed in kaleidoscopes, personal entertainment devices invented in Scotland c. 1815 by Sir David Brewster.
- Mirrors are often used in magic to create an illusion. One effect is called Pepper's ghost.
- Mirror mazes, often found in amusement parks, contain large numbers of mirrors and sheets of glass. The idea is to navigate the disorientating array without bumping into the walls. Mirrors in attractions like this are often made of Plexiglas to prevent breakages.

=== Film and television ===
Mirrors appear in many movies and TV shows:

- Black Swan is a psychological horror film that frequently incorporates mirrors. Fractured mirrors are prominent in the film, and the character Nina stabs herself with a broken piece of mirror.
- Candyman is a horror film about a malevolent spirit summoned by speaking its name in front of a mirror.
- Conan the Destroyer features a mirror-embedded chamber deep within Thoth-Amon's castle. The mirrors are first used in an illusory fashion to deceive Conan once he is separated by his companions, and during a battle sequence it is discovered that by breaking the mirrors he is able to damage and eventually defeat the otherwise-invulnerable wizard Thoth-Amon.
- Dead of Night is an anthology horror film with one segment titled "The Haunted Mirror," in which a mirror casts a murderous spell.
- Doctor Strange, Doctor Strange in the Multiverse of Madness, and Spider-Man: No Way Home feature the fictional mirror dimension, a parallel dimension in the Marvel Universe that reflects objects like a mirror, but in different directions.
- Enter the Dragon's iconic and final fight scene occurs in a mirrored room. The mirrors create multiple reflections of the fight movements but are eventually smashed.
- The Floorwalker and Duck Soup contain a mirror scene in which one person comically pretends to be the mirror reflection of someone else. This mirror scene has been imitated in other comedy films and TV shows.
- Hamlet has a throne room with mirrored walls. Hamlet, played by Kenneth Branagh, gives his famous speech with the words "to be or not to be," looking into these mirrors.
- Harry Potter and the Philosopher's Stone includes the magical Mirror of Erised.
- Inception contains mirrors created in a dream sequence. Ariadne creates two mirrors facing each other that form an infinite number of reflected mirrors.
- Lady in the Lake, a 1947 film noir, was shot from the point of view of the protagonist, who is seen only when a mirror is included in the shot.
- Last Night in Soho is a psychological horror movie with several mirror scenes. The character Ellie occasionally sees her mother's ghost in mirrors.
- The Matrix uses various reflections and mirrors throughout the film. Neo watches a broken mirror mend itself, and different objects create reflections.
- Mirror is a drama film by Andrei Tarkovsky that includes several scenes with mirrors and several scenes shot in reflection.
- Mirror Mirror is a fantasy comedy film based on Snow White that features a Mirror House and Mirror Queen.
- Mirrors is a horror film about haunted mirrors that reflect different scenes than those in front of them.
- Persona relies on mirror sequences to show how the two women, Bibi and Liv, reflect each other and become more alike.
- Poltergeist III features mirrors that do not reflect reality and which can be used as portals to an afterlife.
- Psycho by Alfred Hitchock has several shots with mirrors that reflect characters.
- Oculus is a horror film about a haunted mirror that causes people to hallucinate and commit acts of violence.
- Orpheus includes an important theme of mirrors in connection to aging and death.
- Sailor Moon in the fourth story arc has a major theme pertaining to mirrors, which entrap several of the Sailor Senshi, the fiancée of the protagonist, and the villain in the arc.
- Taxi Driver has a notable scene with a mirror in which the character Travis, played by Robert De Niro, asks himself the famous line, "You talkin' to me?"
- The Lady from Shanghai has a climatic hall of mirrors scene that has become a trope in cinema narratives.
- Raging Bull ends with the character Jake talking to himself in a mirror, a scene that was reused in Boogie Nights.
- The Shining is a horror movie that includes several scenes with mirrors. Every time the character Jack encounters a ghost, a mirror is present.
- The 10th Kingdom miniseries requires the characters to use a magic mirror to travel between New York City (the 10th Kingdom) and the Nine Kingdoms of fairy tale.
- The Twilight Zone episode "The Mirror" features a mirror that the character Clemente believes can provide visions and information about enemies.
- Us is a horror film that includes a girl seeing a doppelgänger of herself in a house of mirrors in a funhouse. The mirror images reflect the similarities in the clones throughout the film.
- Vertigo includes several appearances of mirrors with both Scottie and Madeleine in the frame.

=== Literature ===
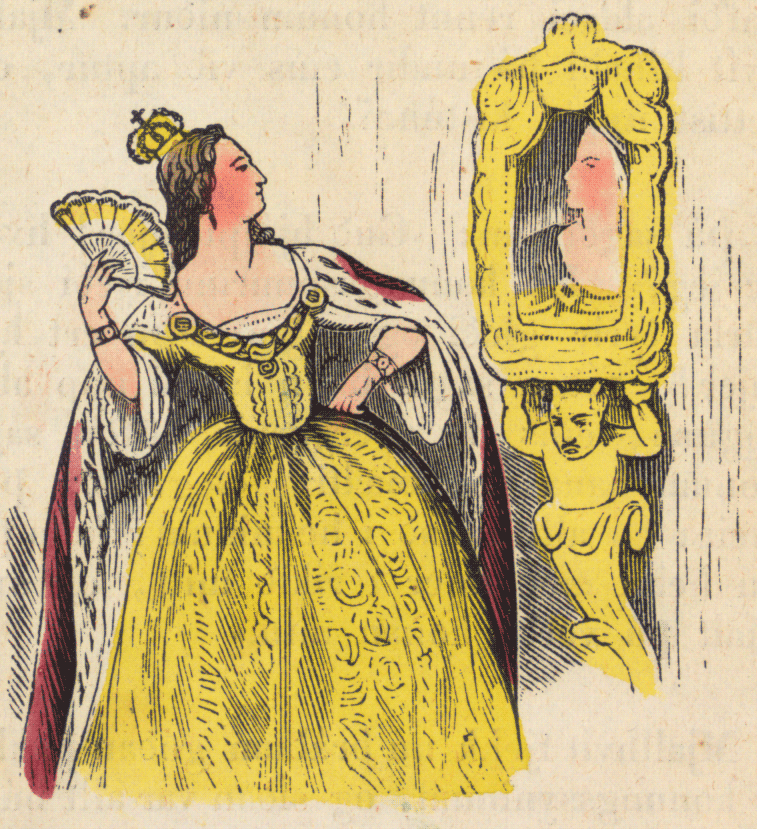
An illustration from page 30 of Mjallhvít (Snow White) an 1852 Icelandic translation of the Grimm-version fairytale

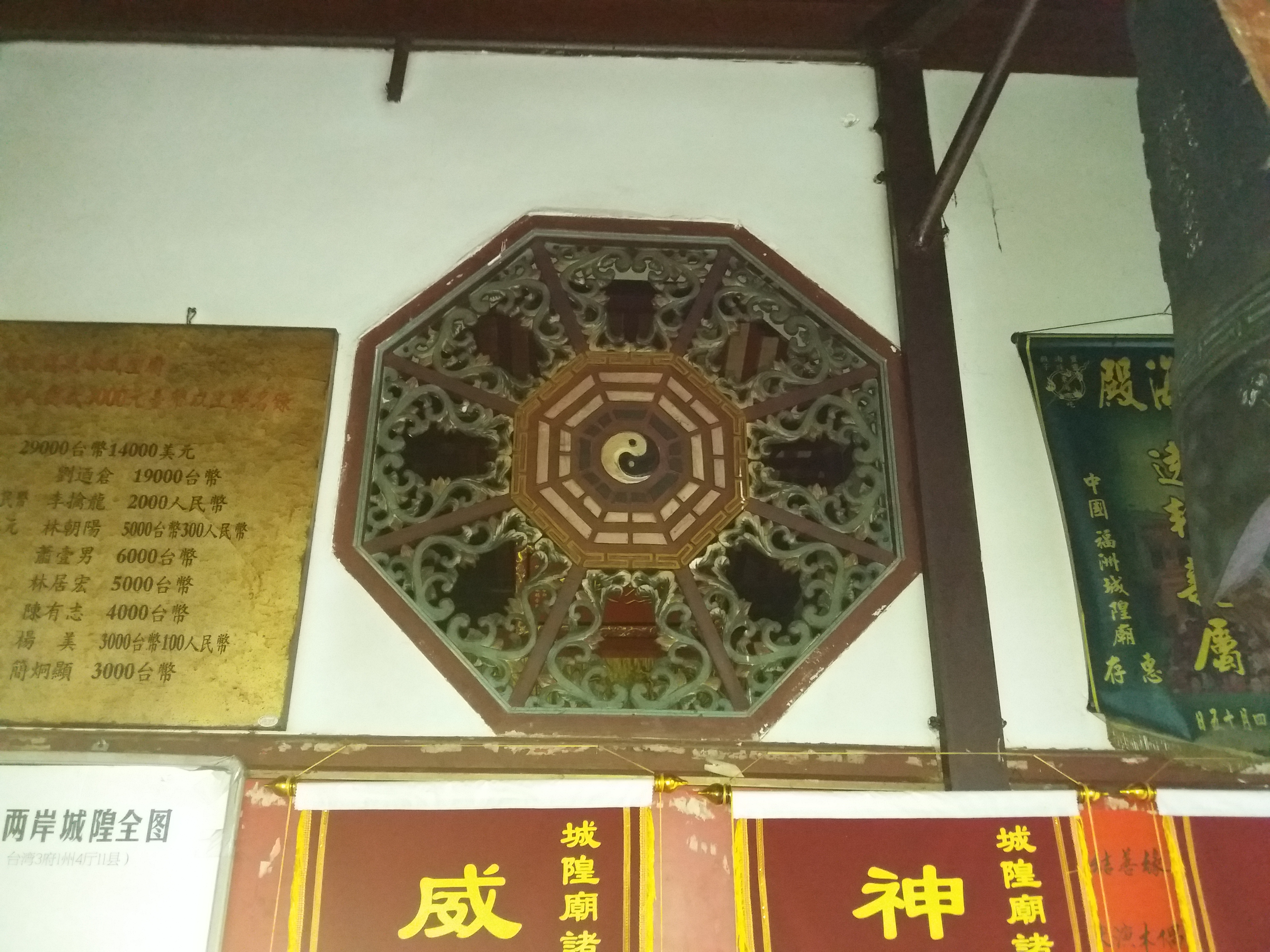
Taijitu within a frame of trigrams and a demon-warding mirror. These charms are believed to frighten away evil spirits and to protect a dwelling from bad luck

Mirrors featured in literature:

- Christian Bible passages, 1 Corinthians 13:12 ("Through a Glass Darkly") and 2 Corinthians 3:18, reference a dim mirror-image or poor mirror-reflection.
- Narcissus of Greek mythology wastes away while gazing, self-admiringly, at his reflection in water.
- Elsewhere in Greek Mythology, Perseus is said to have defeated the Gorgon Medusa with the aid of a mirrored shield which allowed him to avoid the petrifying effect of her visage by only viewing her reflection.
- The Song dynasty history Zizhi Tongjian Comprehensive Mirror in Aid of Governance by Sima Guang is so titled because "mirror" (鑑, jiàn) is used metaphorically in Chinese to refer to gaining insight by reflecting on past experience or history.
- In the late 6th century Chinese folktale The Broken Mirror Restored two lovers who are separated by war break a mirror in two so that they might find each other again by identifying the other half of the mirror. The phrase "broken mirror restored", or "broken mirror joined together" has been used as an idiom to suggests the happy reunion of a separated couple.
- In the European fairy tale, Snow White (collected by the Brothers Grimm in 1812), the evil queen asks, "Mirror, mirror, on the wall... who's the fairest of them all?"
- In the Aarne-Thompson-Uther Index tale type ATU 329, "Hiding from the Devil (Princess)", the protagonist must find a way to hide from a princess, who, in many variants, owns a magical mirror that can see the whole world.
- In Tennyson's famous poem The Lady of Shalott (1833, revised in 1842), the titular character possesses a mirror that enables her to look out on the people of Camelot, as she is under a curse that prevents her from seeing Camelot directly.
- Hans Christian Andersen's fairy tale The Snow Queen, features the devil, in a form of an evil troll, who made a magic mirror that distorts the appearance of everything that it reflects.
- Lewis Carroll's Through the Looking-Glass and What Alice Found There (1871) has become one of the best-loved exemplars of the use of mirrors in literature. The text itself utilizes a narrative that mirrors that of its predecessor, Alice's Adventures in Wonderland.
- In Oscar Wilde's novel, The Picture of Dorian Gray (1890), a portrait serves as a magical mirror that reflects the true visage of the perpetually youthful protagonist, as well as the effect on his soul of each sinful act.
- W. H. Auden's villanelle "Miranda" repeats the refrain: "My dear one is mine as mirrors are lonely".
- The short story Tlön, Uqbar, Orbis Tertius (1940) by Jorge Luis Borges begins with the phrase "I owe the discovery of Uqbar to the conjunction of a mirror and an encyclopedia" and contains other references to mirrors.
- The Trap, a short story by H.P. Lovecraft and Henry S. Whitehead, centers around a mirror. "It was on a certain Thursday morning in December that the whole thing began with that unaccountable motion I thought I saw in my antique Copenhagen mirror. Something, it seemed to me, stirred—something reflected in the glass, though I was alone in my quarters."
- Magical objects in the Harry Potter series (1997–2011) include the Mirror of Erised and two-way mirrors.
- Under Appendix: Variant Planes & Cosmologies of the Dungeons & Dragons Manual of the Planes (2000), is The Plane of Mirrors (page 204). It describes the Plane of Mirrors as a space existing behind reflective surfaces, and experienced by visitors as a long corridor. The greatest danger to visitors upon entering the plane is the instant creation of a mirror-self with the opposite alignment of the original visitor.
- The Mirror Thief, a novel by Martin Seay (2016), includes a fictional account of industrial espionage surrounding mirror-manufacturing in 16th-century Venice.
- The Glass Floor, a short story by Stephen King, concerns a mysterious and deadly mirrored floor.
- The Reaper's Image, a short story by Stephen King, concerns a rare Elizabethan mirror that displays the Reaper's image when viewed, which symbolises the death of the viewer.
- Kilgore Trout, a protagonist of Kurt Vonnegut's novel Breakfast of Champions, believes that mirrors are windows to other universes, and refers to them as "leaks", a recurring motif in the book.
- In The Fellowship of the Ring by J. R. R. Tolkien, the Mirror of Galadriel allows one to see things of the past, present and possible future. The mirror additionally appears in the movie adaptation.

== Mirror test ==
Only a few animal species have been shown to have the ability to recognize themselves in a mirror, most of them mammals. Experiments have found that the following animals can pass the mirror test:

- Humans. Humans tend to fail the mirror test until they are about 18 months old, or what psychoanalysts call the "mirror stage".
- All great apes:
  - Bonobos
  - Chimpanzees
  - Orangutans
  - Gorillas. Initially, it was thought that gorillas did not pass the test, but there are now several well-documented reports of gorillas (such as Koko) passing the test.
- Bottlenose dolphins
- Orcas
- Elephants
- European magpies

== See also ==
- Anish Kapoor (artist working with mirrors)
- Aranmula kannadi
- Chirality (mathematics)
- Corner reflector
- Curved mirror
- Deformable mirror
- Digital micromirror device
- Heliotrope (instrument)
- Honeycomb mirror
- List of telescope parts and construction
- Melong
- Mirror armour
- Non-reversing mirror
- Mirror writing
- Mirrors in Mesoamerican culture
- Perfect mirror
- Periscope
- Selfie
- Spectrophobia
- Street mirrors
- TLV mirror
- Venus effect
- Toli
