= Sony camcorders =

Camcorders produced by Sony

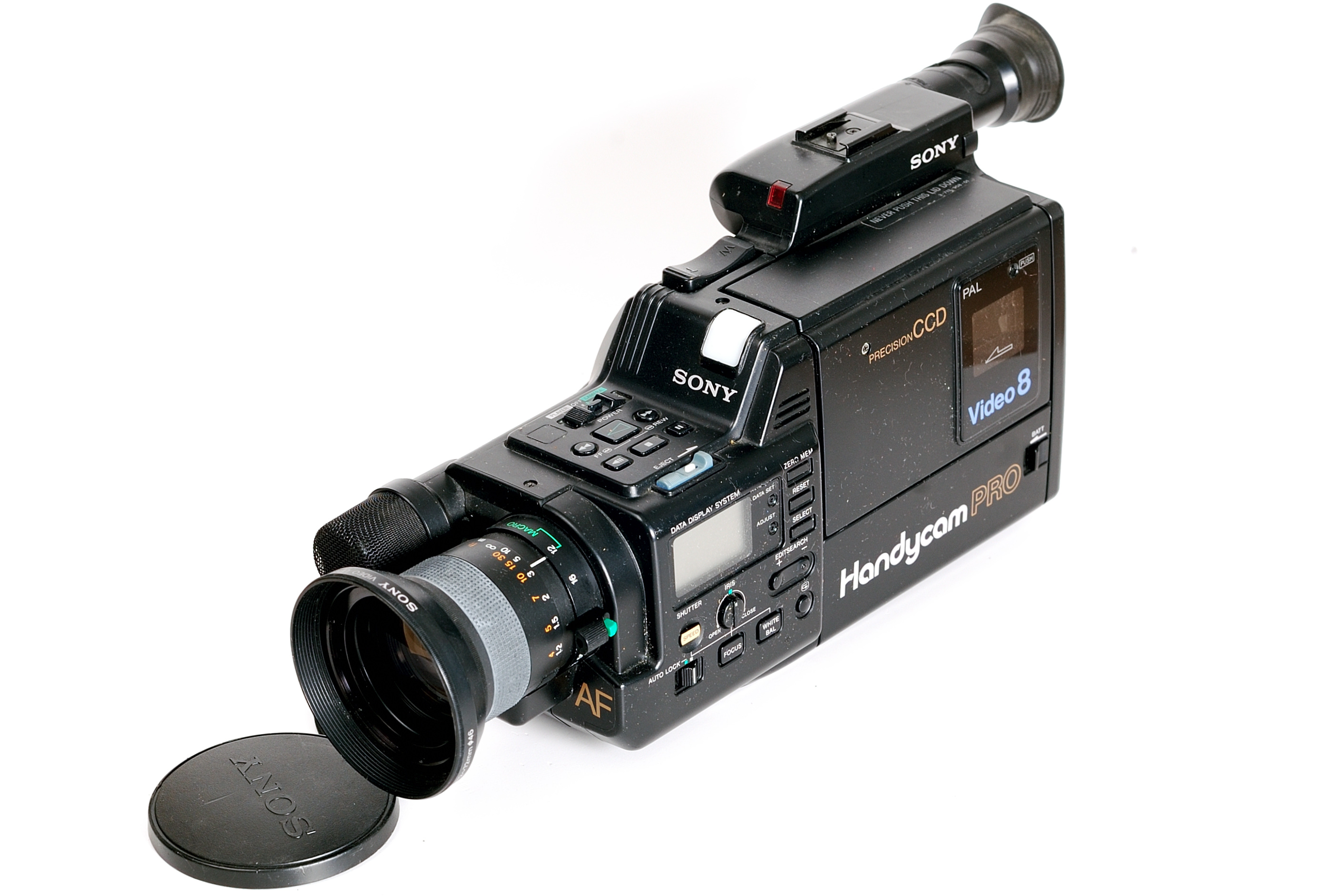
Sony Handycam Pro CCD-V90E which was manufactured in 1987 used Video 8 videocassette.

Sony Corporation (commonly known as Sony) produces professional, consumer, and prosumer camcorders such as studio and broadcast, digital cinema cameras, camcorders, pan-tilt-zoom and remote cameras.

== Analog models ==
Sony made many analogue camcorders, mainly under the Handycam line from the mid 1980s until the early 2000s. The analogue models mostly used 8mm tape formats before digital formats such as miniDV and Digital8 took over.

=== Handycam ===
Handycam, launched in 1985, is Sony's line of handheld (as opposed to shoulder-mounted) camcorders, originally recording to 8mm video cassettes.

== Digital standard definition models ==
=== Sony DCR-VX1000 ===
The VX1000, introduced in 1995, was the first digital consumer MiniDV camcorder. It is also widely used by professional skateboarding videographers. Century Optics designed the Mk1 fisheye lens just for the VX1000. The VX1000 excels at daytime colors.

=== Sony DCR-TRV900/DSR-PD100 ===
These models gained wide-scale popularity when paired with Century Optics Mk1 or Mk2.

=== Sony DCR-VX2000 & Sony DSR-PD150 ===
The VX2000/PD150 sister models improved on the VX1000 in low light sensitivity and added LCD screen. Both models have 1/3 in (8.5 mm) CCD sensors while the PD150 has XLR audio inputs and independent iris and gain controls.

- A modified version of the Camera was used on September 11 attacks Camera best known for Filming the first plane Impact .

=== Sony DCR-VX2100 & Sony DSR-PD170 ===
The VX2100/PD170 improved on the VX2000/PD150 models with low light sensitivity of 1 lux, improved LCD screen, and 24 iris increments from 12.

DCR – VX series (1995–2009)
Model	Release date	Sensor detail	Lens (35mm equivalent)	LCD Screen	Viewfinder	Memory functionality	Analog passthrough	Battery type	Weight	Photo	Notes
DCR – VX1000	1995	3CCD 1/3 in (8.5 mm) 410k pixels	42 – 420mm (10× zoom)	NO	180k pixels Color viewfinder	NO	NO	Infolithium L (can't take F970 batteries)	???		First ever MiniDV camcorder
DCR – VX700	1995	1CCD 1/3 in (8.5 mm) 410k pixels	42 – 420mm (10× zoom)	NO	180k pixels Color viewfinder	NO	NO	Infolithium L (can't take F970 batteries)	300g		Pretty uncommon and rare
DCR – VX9000	1998	3CCD 1/3 in (8.5 mm) 410k pixels	42 – 420mm (10× zoom)	NO	Detachable Monochrome CRT viewfinder	NO	NO	Infolithium L	3.4kg		A shoulder-mount version of the DCR-VX1000 that uses full-size DV cassettes, a very uncommon and rare camera
DCR – VX2000	2000	3CCD 1/3 in (8.5 mm) 380k pixels (340k effective)	43.2 – 518.4mm (12× zoom)	2.5" 200k pixels (880×288)	Color viewfinder	640×480 stills (standard Memory stick)	YES	Infolithium L	1.6kg		
DCR – VX2100	2003	3CCD 1/3 in (8.5 mm) 380k pixels (340k effective)	43.2 – 518.4mm (12× zoom)	2.5" 200k pixels (880×288)	Color viewfinder	640×480 stills (standard Memory stick)	YES	Infolithium L	1.6kg		Almost the same camcorder as the VX2000, add buttons onto the handle, no longer had ridges on the underside of the handle
DCR – VX2200E (PAL ONLY)	2009	3CMOS 1/3 in (8.5 mm) 1.2M pixels (1M effective)	29.5 – 590mm (20× zoom)	3.2" 16:9 921k pixels (1920×480)	Color viewfinder	1440×810 stills (Memory stick PRO duo)	NO	Infolithium L			SD version of the HDR-FX1000E

DCR – PC series (1996–2005)
Model	Release date	Sensor detail	Lens (35mm equivalent)	LCD Screen	Viewfinder	Memory stick type	Still resolution	Card video resolution	Analog passthrough	Battery type	Special features	Weight	Photo	Notes
DCR- PC7	1996	1CCD 1/3 in (8.5 mm)	38 – 380mm	2.5" 84k pixels (384×220)	Color viewfinder	NO			NO	Infolithium F		189g		advertised as a Passport sized camcorder
DCR – PC100	1999	1CCD 1/4" 1M pixels (690k effective)	40 – 400mm (memory mode) 48 – 480mm (tape mode)	2.5" 200k pixels (880×288)	Color viewfinder	standard Memory stick	1152×864	NO	Record to tape only	Infolithium M		650g		
DCR – PC110	2000	1CCD 1/4" 1M pixels (690k effective)	40 – 400mm (memory mode) 48 – 480mm (tape mode)	2.5" 200k pixels (880×288)	Color viewfinder	standard Memory stick	1152×864	320×240 8.333fps 15s 160×112 8.333fps 60s	YES	Infolithium M	Has a flash for still photography	690g		First camcorder from Sony able to record videos onto flash storage
DCR – PC55	2005	1CCD 1/6" 800k pixels (400k effective)	44 – 440mm	3" 123k pixels (560×220)	Color viewfinder	Memory stick PRO duo	640×480	320×240 8.333fps	YES	Infolithium A	smallest MiniDV camcorder ever made	360g		Requires a DCRA-C131 dock
DCR – PC1000	2005	3CMOS 1/6" 790k pixels (670k effective)	40 – 400mm (memory mode 44 – 520mm (tape mode)	2.7" 123k pixels (560×220)	Color viewfinder	Memory stick PRO duo	1920×1440	320×240 8.333fps	YES	Infolithium A	the only camcorder in this series to sport a 3 sensor setup	470g		Requires a DCRA-C140 dock

=== Sony DSR-570 & Sony DSR-390 ===
The DSR-570 and DSR-390 are based on the DVCAM format developed by Sony. The DSR-570 utilizes three 2/3 inch CCDs which are natively in the 16:9 format. The large CCDs achieve a 570,000 pixel density and over 800 TV lines in 16:9 mode (It can also achieve 850 TV lines if set to 4:3 mode). Due to the CCDs Hyper Gain option they are extremely sensitive in less than favorable lighting situations; that may be as dim as 0.25 lx. Both DSR-570 and DSR-390 are intrinsically different from most camcorders because of its hybrid capabilities. Both camcorders, along with several other cameras in its family line, contain the 26-pin CCU port. This is unorthodox when compared with its successors and peers. In most cases a studio camera equipped with TRIAX or a CCU would not contain a VTR, but DSR-570 and DSR-390 did. A camcorder, which typically would contain a VTR, would not contain the ports traditionally associated with studio cameras. These camcorders married the two together in one package.

== Older high definition models ==
=== HDC Series System Cameras ===
==== Sony HDC-700 Series ====
Introduced in 1998 for HDTV video broadcast era. HDC-700A/750A were Sony HDVS compatible and equipped with 2 million pixel frame-interline-transfer (FIT) CCD imager that could capture 1080 of active lines per frame. For sensitivity, it achieved F8.0 at 2000 lux. HDC-700A Series inherits many of the main features of the field proven SDTV Sony BVP-700/500 Series cameras.

- Sony HDC-700A – HD studio/OB camera
- Sony HDC-750A – HD portable companion camera
- Sony HDC700A/L
- Sony HDCU-700A

==== Sony HDC-900 Series ====
Introduced in 2000.

- HDC-900/910

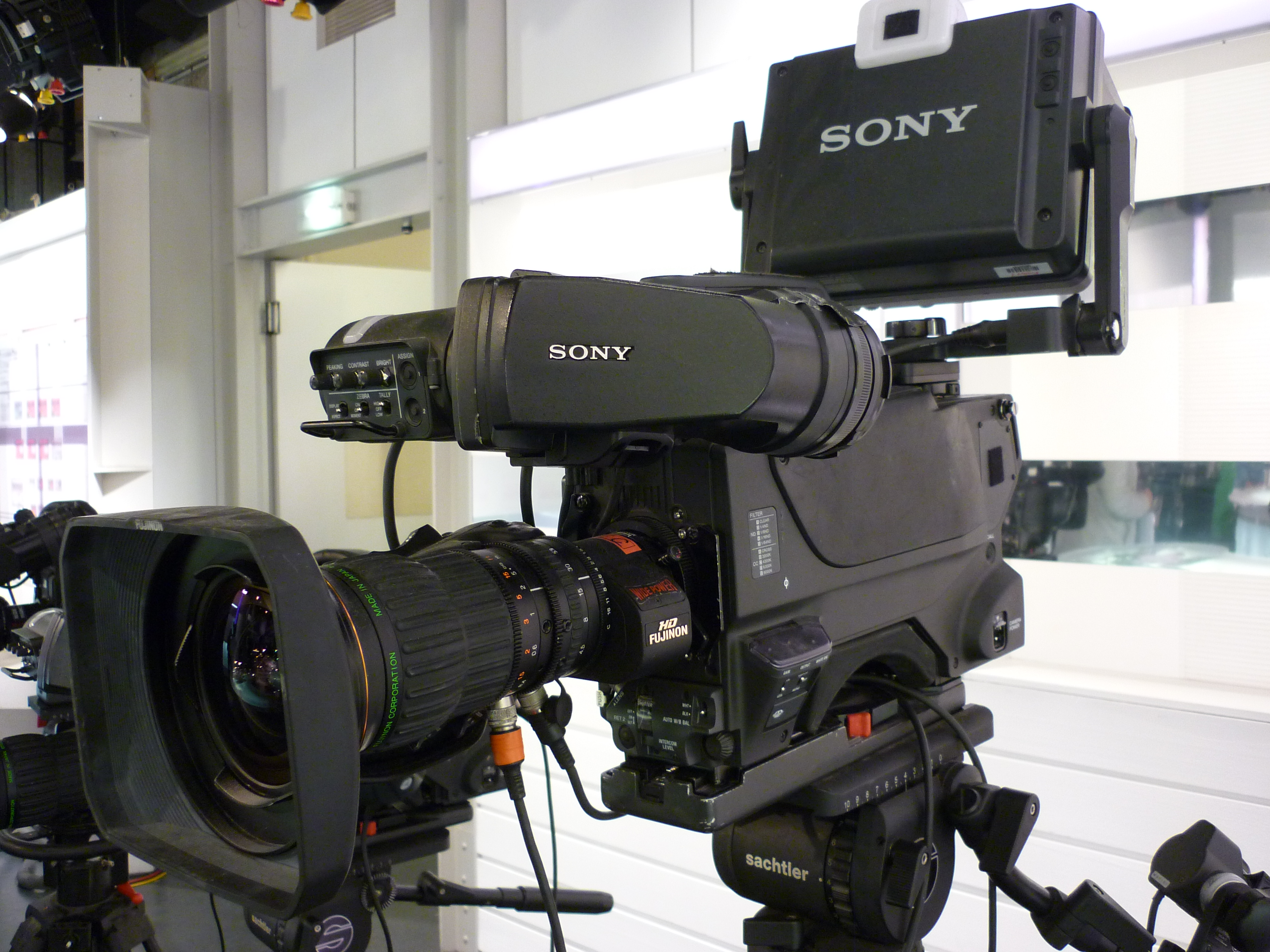
Sony HDC-1550 HDVS

=== Point of view cameras ===
- Sony DXC-H10 is a small HDVS (high definition video system) point of view HD camera introduced in 1998 capable of recording 1000 TV lines of resolution and weighs 1.2 kg.

=== Sony HDR-HC1 ===
The Sony HDR-HC1, introduced in mid-2005 (MSRP $1999 US), was the first HDV CMOS camcorder to support 1080i. The CMOS sensor has a resolution of 1920×1440 for digital still pictures and captures video at 1440×1080 interlaced. The camera supports digital image stabilization.

The camcorder can convert captured HDV data to DV data for editing using non-linear editing systems which do not support HDV or for creating edits which are viewable on non-HDTV television sets.

The HVR-A1 is the prosumer version of the HDR-HC1, having additional manual controls and XLR ports.

=== Sony HDR-HC5 ===
The Sony HDR-HC5, introduced in May 2007 (MSRP $1099 US), was the third DV tape HDV CMOS camcorder to support 1080i. The 1/3 in (8.5 mm) CMOS sensor has a resolution of 2MP and interlaced 4MP for digital still pictures and captures video at 1440×1080 interlaced. Digital photos can be stored on a Sony Memory Stick. It requires a minimum of 2Lux.

=== Sony HDR-HC7 ===
The Sony HDR-HC7, introduced in 2008 (MSRP $1399 US), was another DV tape HDV CMOS camcorder to support 1080i. The 1/2.9 CMOS sensor has a resolution of 3MP and interlaced 6.1MP for digital still pictures and captures video at 1440×1080 interlaced.

The camera includes a manual focus wheel, mic and headphone jacks, and a slightly larger imaging sensor, producing 3200K gross pixels versus the HC5' 2100K. The HC7 also sports Sony's Super SteadyShot optical image stabilization system.

In December 2007, Sony released the HD1000, the shoulder mount version of the HC7. Its advantage include much more stable off-tripod footage; full-size zoom control; custom ring to manually control focusing, exposure (iris and gain), zoom, or shutter speed; support for a large video light on its front cold shoe; and wireless audio.

=== Sony HDR-FX1 ===
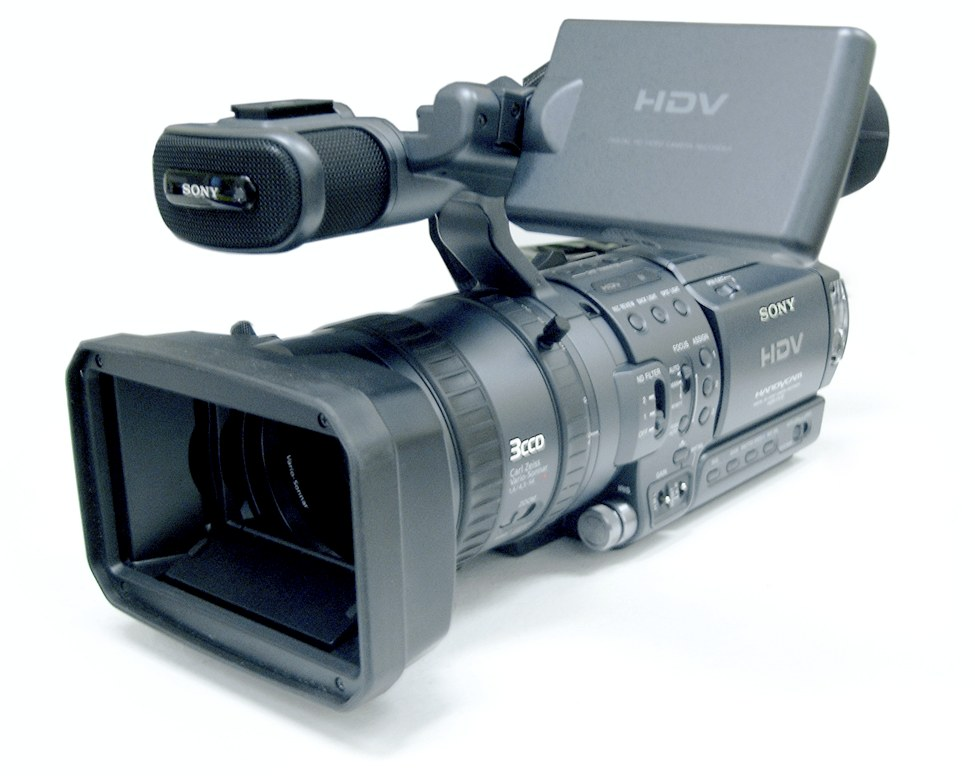
Sony HDR-FX1

The Sony HDR-FX1, introduced in late 2004, was the first HDV 3CCD camcorder to support 1080i (1440 × 1080 resolution with 4:2:0 color sampling). The Sony HVR-Z1U and HVR-Z1E are the "professional" versions of this camera with additional features such as balanced XLR audio inputs, DVCAM recording, and extended DSP capabilities (i.e. cine/gamma controls).

The HDR-FX1 includes three 1/3-inch (8.5 mm) 16:9 1.12 Megapixel gross CCDs. Each CCD measures 1012 × 1111 pixels total, 972 × 1100 effective. It includes a 12× optical zoom Carl Zeiss Vario-Sonnar T* lens, a 3.5-inch LCD screen, a zoom ring, focus ring, and an iris / aperture adjustment knob.

==== Cineframe ====
The FX1 offers Cineframe shooting modes at 30 and 24 frames per second. The camera uses an interlaced image but extracts progressive images from individual fields by doubling them. The 30fps and 24fps do not offer the same resolution as true progressive scanning. The 24fps Cineframe shooting mode does not offer the same resolution, or motion cadence as true 24fps progressive scanning.

==== Known flaw ====
When the audio mode of HDR-FX1/HDR-FX1E camcorder is switched to the 16-bit setting (in DV mode) and the unit is then turned off, the unit resets to the default 12-bit setting, though the LCD indicator of the unit continues to display the 16-bit audio setting.

=== Sony HDR-FX7 ===
The Sony HDR-FX7, was introduced in September 2006. The new camcorder was the first camcorder below $3,000 to offer full 1080 HD resolution with a three-chip sensor.

- Resolution: Sony claims "full" 1080 HD
- Sensor: changed to 3 × 1/4" ClearVid CMOS
- Light sensitivity: worse by 33% (4lux)
- Zoom: increased to 20× optical zoom (30× digital)
- Lens/filter: decreased to 62mm/bayonet mount
- Optical Image Stabilizer (OIS, SteadyShot 4 settings)
- Video out: included HDMI
- Weight: reduced to 1.6 kg (3.52 lb.)

The company claims that HDR-FX7 has much improved resolution (full 1080i HD) under good lighting. In low-light situations, Sony FX1 will still produce better results.

=== Sony HDR-SR1/HDR-SR5/HDR-SR7 ===
The Sony HDR-SR1, introduced in late 2006, was Sony's first high definition hard disk drive based camcorder. It launched with a 30 gigabyte internal drive and – along with the Sony HDR-UX1 – is the first camcorder that records high definition video in AVCHD format. In June 2007, Sony released two new AVCHD format HD Hard Disk camcorders, a 40 GB (HDR-SR5) and 60 GB model (HDR-SR7). All three have the ability to record Dolby Digital 5.1

== Newer high definition models ==
=== Sony HDR-CX7 ===
In June 2007, Sony released the HDR-CX7, the first Sony AVCHD camcorder to record video to a memory card. The product comes bundled with a 4 GB Memory Stick Duo that holds 30 mins of HD video.

Sony HDR-CX7 weighs 15 ounces with the supplied battery and can record nearly one hour of full HD 1080i video on an 8 GB memory card. It can record longer videos at a lower resolution.

This handycam features a crash-proof recording system. It is equipped with a 6.1-megapixel CMOS image sensor and a 5.4-54mm/F1.8-2.9 zoom lens.

It saves files with a resolution of 1440 × 1080i. The video format specifies a rectangular pixel shape. Most players render this as 1920 × 1080 format after adjusting for the rectangular pixels.

For this camera, the maximum recording rate is 15 Mbit/s.

=== Sony HDR-CX12 ===
In August 2008, Sony released the successor to the HDR-CX7, the HDR-CX12, with a retail price of $899.99.

Major features include:

- 1920×1080i Recording
- 1/3 in (8.5 mm) ClearVid CMOS sensor
- Dolby Digital 5.1 audio
- 10.2MP still image capture
- Face Detection and Smile Shutter technology

=== Sony HDR-CX500V ===
Sony released the HDR-CX500V in 2009. The CX500V added GPS tagging capability, a new 1/2.8-inch sensor, and enhanced optical image stabilization.

=== Sony HVR-Z1 ===
The Sony HVR-Z1 is a professional, broadcast quality, HDV camcorder. It is popular for producers of documentaries and other television programs because of its small size and relatively low cost. It records in 1080i.

It uses the DV recording format, and can record in the DV, DVCAM and HDV variants. It can also record in PAL (25 frames) and NTSC (30 frames).

=== Sony HVR-Z5 ===
The Sony HVR-Z5 was introduced in October 2008. It uses Sony's new G-Lens, alongside the 3 ClearVid CMOS Sensor system, which works well in low light. The HVR-Z5E can switch between HDV 1080i, DVCAM and standard DV recording.

=== Sony HVR-Z7/HVR-S270 ===
The Sony HVR-Z7 and HVR-S270 video cameras, introduced in early 2008, were the first 3CMOS sensor HDV camcorders that can record on tape and/or CF card. In previous prosumer models, Sony released model pairs that shared the same optics and sensors, such as the VX2000/PD150, VX2100/PD170, Z1/FX1, and V1/FX7; where the VX/FX was the consumer version and the PD/Z was the professional/prosumer version. The consumer models lacked professional features such as XLR inputs and some manual controls. The HVR-Z7 breaks this pattern as it has all professional features of previous prosumer models, and has no consumer equivalent, although it has a larger shoulder-mounted sister camera, the HVR-S270.

Both video cameras feature interchangeable lenses. They attain low light sensitivity similar to the SD low light leader, the Sony DSR-PD170, and offer interlaced and progressive recording in HDV, DVCAM, and DV formats. Compact Flash recording is achieved by a supplied CF card recorder that is removable and connects via a proprietary firewire connection or 6 pin firewire.

=== Sony HDR-FX1000/HVR-Z5 ===
The first true successors to the HDR-FX1 and the HVR-Z1, the HDR-FX1000 and HVR-Z5 were released in autumn 2008. They employ the same Exmor 1/3" 3CMOS design as the Z7/S270, and the Z5 is bundled with the same CF card recorder as the Z7, but the physical designs more closely resemble that of the FX1 and Z1.

Both models support interlaced and progressive scan recording. HVR-Z5 has native progressive recording. Both models have the 1-megapixel XtraFine LCD screen included in the EX1, Z7, and SR11/12. These camcorders introduced Sony G Lenses. The zoom range extends 20×, 29.5-595 35mm equivalent. It has a wider view angle than most fixed lenses in this price range.

=== Sony HDR-GW ===
The Sony HDR-GW55 was introduced in 2012 and is designed to be held vertically. It is marketed as a waterproof, dustproof and shock-resistant Full HD camcorder. It can withstand up to a depth of 5m and accidental drops from 1.5m of height. It comes with a 10 × optical zoom lens. It has a GPS function for geolocating photos and videos.

Its successor, the HDR-GW66, was released in 2013. It has improved waterproof capabilities. It can withstand up to a depth of 10 meters and temperatures as cold as −10 °C. It uses a larger battery which increases recording time considerably. A front button was added for improved usability.

=== Sony PMW-EX1 ===
The Sony PMW-EX1 is a high definition camcorder which costs $7,790 MSRP. The Sony EX1 is popular among independent filmmakers due to the 1/2" TrueHD sensors, better depth of field control, and better low light capabilities. Other comparable class cameras use 1/3" sensors and pixel shifting or other schemes to simulate resolution.

The PMW-EX1 utilizes Sony's three 1/2-inch type "Exmor" CMOS sensors, each with an effective pixel count of 1920 x 1080. Coupled with signal processing LSI, the PMW-EX1 produces images in 1080p (30 and 24 frame/s), 720p (up to 60 frame/s) and 1080i (up to 60 frame/s) HD.

The Sony EX1 records internally to SxS (S by S) cards and does not internally record to tape (an external tape device would be required). The SxS-1 card was introduced in December 2009 as a more affordable option with a shorter operational life than SxS Pro cards.

Development of the ExpressCard adapters such as MxR, MxM and KxT have allowed for the use of selected consumer-level SDHC cards at standard frame rates and 720p rates up to 42 frame/s.

For 4:2:2 color, an external recording device would be required to be used utilizing the EX1's HD-SDI out.

External recording storage devices include: PHU-60K

Sony SxS card management strategies for video and film production.

== High-definition 3D models ==
=== Sony HDR-TD10 ===
The TD10 is Sony's first 3D AVCHD camcorder. It records on an internal 64 GB hard drive or onto Sony Memory Stick Pro memory cards, or onto SDHC cards. Released in 2011, it can record a maximum of 28 Mbit/s in 3D or 2D. Its two sensors are ¼" (4.5 mm) and each has gross 4200K pixels, can produce a maximum 5.3-megapixel image in 16:9 (3072×1728).

=== Sony HDR-TD20V ===
The TD20 is Sony's second generation of 3D AVCHD camcorder. It has been modified mainly to be a little smaller than TD10 and they also shortened distance between lenses, which makes the 3D effect a little less significant, but it is compensated with internal software. It records on internal 64 GB hard disk or onto Sony Memory Stick Pro storage cards, or onto SDHC cards. Released in 2012, it can record to max 28 Mbit/s in 3D or 2D. Its two sensors are 1/3.91 inch (4.6 mm) and each has gross 5430K pixels, and can produce a maximum 20.4-megapixel image in 16:9 (6016×3384).

=== Sony HDR-TD30V ===
The TD30 is Sony's third iteration of the TD10 model. It records only onto Sony Memory Stick Pro memory cards, or onto SDHC cards. Sony removed the manual focus knob. Released in 2013, it can record a maximum of 28 Mbit/s in 3D or 2D. Its two sensors are 1/3.91 inch (4.6 mm) and each has gross 5430K pixels, can produce a maximum 20.4-megapixel image in 16:9 (6016×3384).

== High definition 'NX' range ==
=== Sony HXR-NX5 ===
The NX5 is Sony's first professional AVCHD camcorder. It records either onto Sony Memory Stick Pro memory cards, or onto SDHC cards. An optional 128 GB Flash Memory unit provides up to 11 hours of recording time. It can record in Standard Definition using MPEG-2 format, or up to 1920 × 1080 images at 24 Mbit/s in High Definition mode in the AVCHD format. The camera is almost identical to the HVR-Z5, some people calling it the 'Tapeless version of the Z5'.

=== Sony HXR-MC50E ===
This compact camera comes with a 3.5mm audio input, but no balanced XLR inputs. It records up to 6 hours of full HD on 64 Gb internal memory.

== Ultra high definition models ==
Camcorders that support resolution of 3840×2160 (UHD also known as 4K).

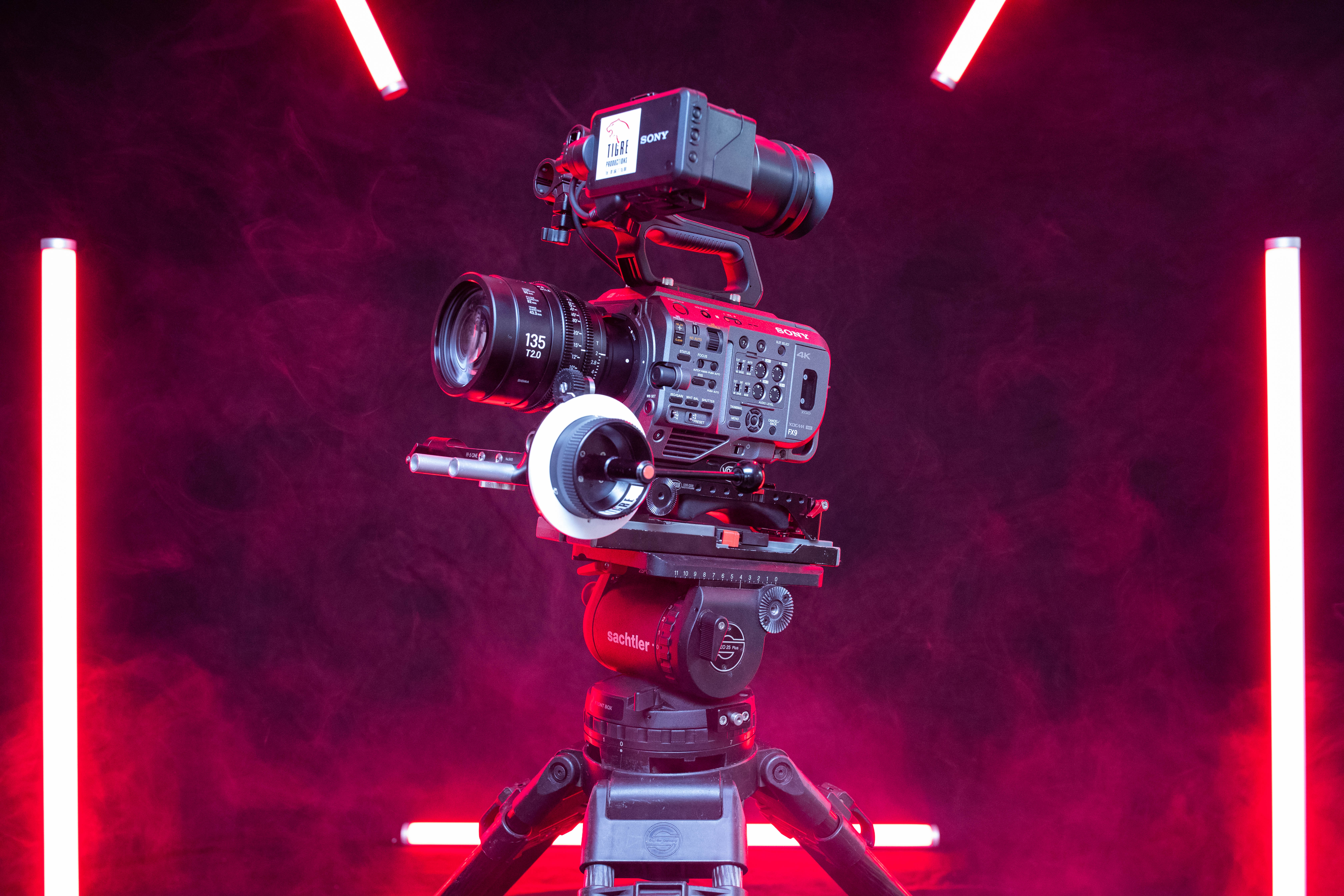
Sony PXW-FX9 XDCAM 6K Full-Frame Camera with Sigma 135mm T2 lens

=== Sony FDR-AX100 ===
In January 2014, Sony released its first consumer UHD Camcorder. The AX100 is able to capture video at 3840×2160 resolution at 30p using a 1" Exmor R CMOS sensor. It uses a full sensor readout instead of line skipping which provides very high detail with minimal aliasing or moiré. It captures video using 14MP and then resizes the image to 8MP. It can capture photos at 20 MP. The highest quality video output uses XAVC S format based on MPEG-4 AVC/H.264 compression. Typical data rates are about 60 Mbit/s in this mode (100 Mbit/s in the firmware version 3.00). The SDXC memory card class 10 is required for XAVC S recording (SDXC class 10 U3 is required for 100 Mbit/s recording).

The Zeiss Vario Sonnar T* Lens provides a 12× optical zoom which starts at 29mm equivalent wide-angle. There is an optional 24× Clear Image zoom which zooms by using a smaller number of pixels until it matches the resolution of the output. Digital zoom can extend to 160× although with progressively degrading quality. Optical SteadyShot Image Stabilization has an optional mode called Intelligent Active Mode which using digital techniques on top of the optical stabilization to stabilize even more aggressively. The AX100 has neutral density filters built into the camera which is rare for a consumer camera. It can be set to automatic or manual control with the following settings: Off, 1/4, 1/16, and 1/64.

The AX100 provides both an EVF (0.39" OLED) and LCD screen (3.5" 0.921 MP). The multi-interface accessory shoe allows connection to an external flash or stereo microphones. The remote control interface is available via the multi-terminal port.

=== Sony FDR-AX33 ===
In March 2015, Sony released this smaller, lighter weight UHD camcorder using a 1/2.3" sensor with many of the same features as the AX100. With this camcorder, Sony introduced "Balanced Optical SteadyShot" (BOSS), essentially a floating lens/sensor block combination to reduce shake. It comes with a 10× lens. Along with the reduced size is the reduced size EVF (0.24") and LCD screen (3.0" 0.921 MP).

=== Sony FDR-AX53 ===
Introduced in 2016, this camcorder improves on the previous versions with the addition of bigger pixels in the same 1/2.5 sensor, hot shoe for an external microphone accessory, and in addition to optical steady shot, there is now 5 axis sensor stabilization, but it's disabled in 4k.

- Sony spec page
- Sony Press Conference Introducing the camera

=== Digital Cinema Cameras ===
- Sony Venice
- Sony Venice 2 – Full-frame digital cinema camera with internal X-OCN recording and possibility to use 8K or 6K sensors.

== Camcorder with built-in projector ==
In 2011, Sony released 3 camcorders with a built-in projector at the back of the LCD panel that can display images up to 60 inches away onto non-transparent flat surface in front of the camcorder. HDR-PJ50V, HDR-PJ30V and HDR-PJ10 have the same specifications, except memory. They have 220 GB internal hard drive, 32 GB flash memory and 16 GB flash memory respectively. The ¼-inch CMOS sensor camcorders have 12 optical zoom lenses and can record 1080/60p video, slot for SD/SDHC/SDXC or Memory Stick PRO Duo memory cards and GPS (except HDR-PJ10).

In 2012, Sony released 2 camcorders with a built-in projector. HDR-PJ200 lacks internal memory, microphone jack and surround sound recording. The Sony HDR-PJ260 offers improved features such as an 8.9 megapixel still camera but includes 16 GB internal memory. More expensive models include the HDR-PJ580, HDR-PJ600 and HDR-PJ760.

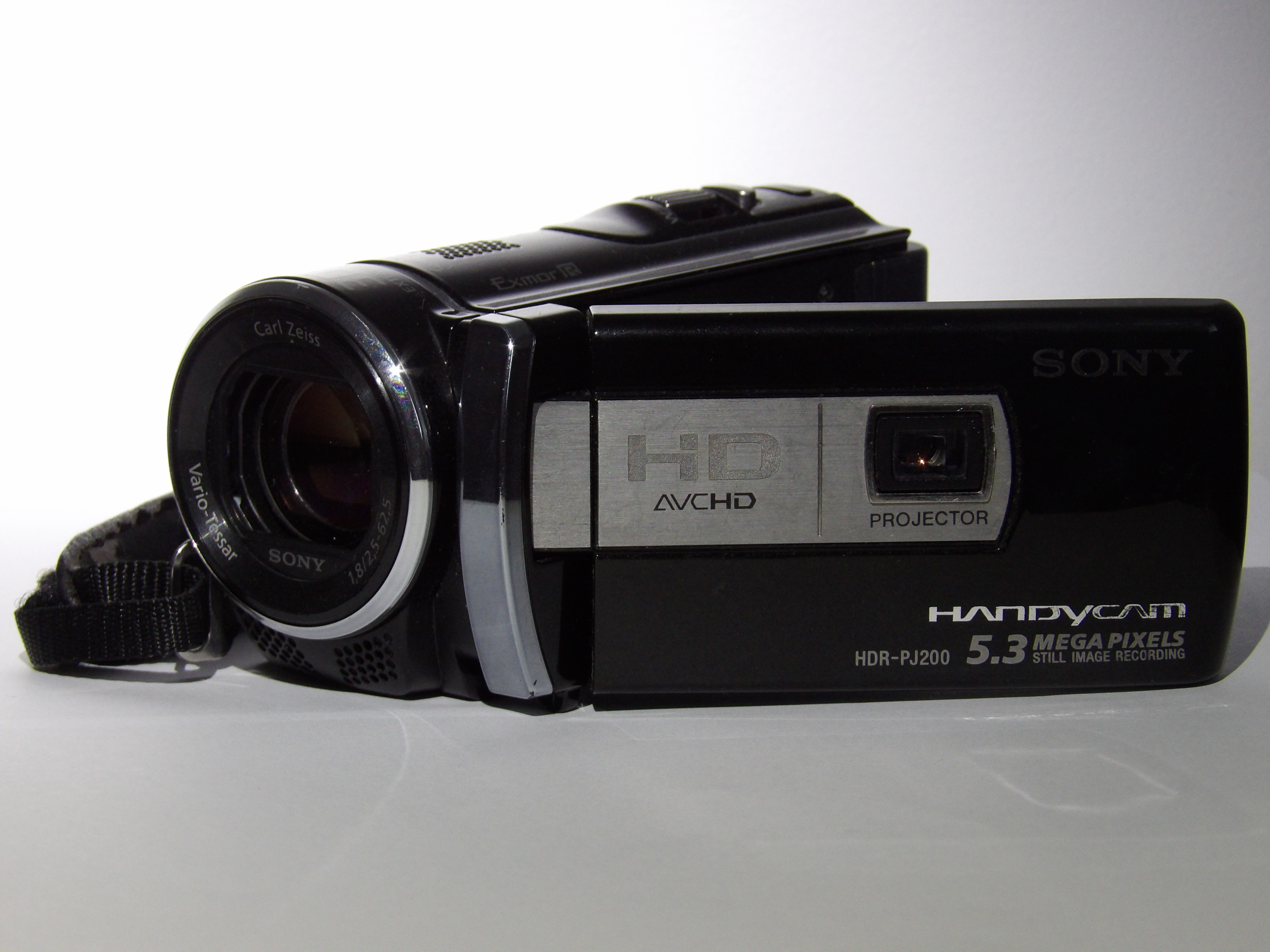
A Sony HDR-PJ200E with a built-in projector behind the LCD panel.

== See also ==
- Sony Handycam
- CineAlta
- Sony Action Cam
