= Three-CCD camera =

Imaging system using three sensors

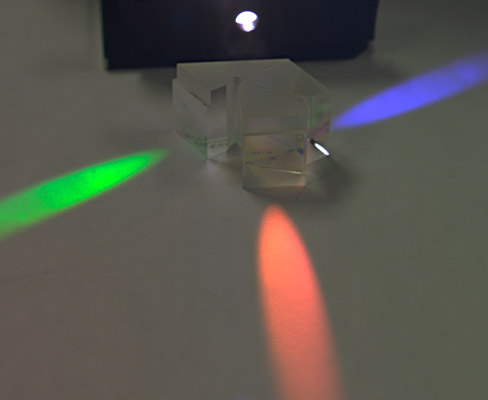
A beam-splitter prism assembly, with a white beam entering the front, exiting the three focal-plane faces, filtered to produce red, green and blue

A Philips type trichroic beam-splitter prism schematic, with a different color separation order than the assembly shown in the photo. The red and blue beams each undergo one total internal reflection at the air gap and air–glass boundary respectively, while the other reflections are dichroic. This construction has the advantage over the above type that all 3 separated images are laterally inverted (as with a single sensor). In the first type, the blue image is not laterally inverted but the other two are.

A three-CCD (3CCD) camera is a camera whose imaging system uses three separate charge-coupled devices (CCDs), each one receiving filtered red, green, or blue color ranges. Light coming in from the lens is split by a beam-splitter prism into three beams, which are then filtered to produce colored light in three color ranges or "bands". The system is employed by high quality still cameras, telecine systems, professional video cameras and some prosumer video cameras.

== Overview ==
Compared to cameras with only one CCD, three-CCD cameras generally provide superior image quality by using full-frame dichroic filters to better separate the red, green and blue color bands, and better low-light performance. By separating red, green, and blue color ranges with a 1:1 pixel ratio (known as "4:4:4"), three-CCD cameras achieve much better precision than single-CCD cameras.

In contrast, almost all single-CCD cameras use a Bayer filter, using less accurate dye filters in front of each pixel to separate the colors. Because each pixel on a single CCD sensor is covered with its own tiny color filter, a frame is necessary to keep the dye filters from leaking into adjacent pixels. The result is less light absorbed compared to a CCD without a Bayer filter. Typically there is a 2:1 ratio of green and red/blue pixels, producing less color detail.

Three-CCD cameras are more expensive than single-CCD cameras because they use three sensors rather than one, and because they use a beam splitter to drive each of the three CCD chips. Additionally most 3CCD cameras use higher quality but more expensive dichroic filters to separate the color bands.

== Image gallery ==
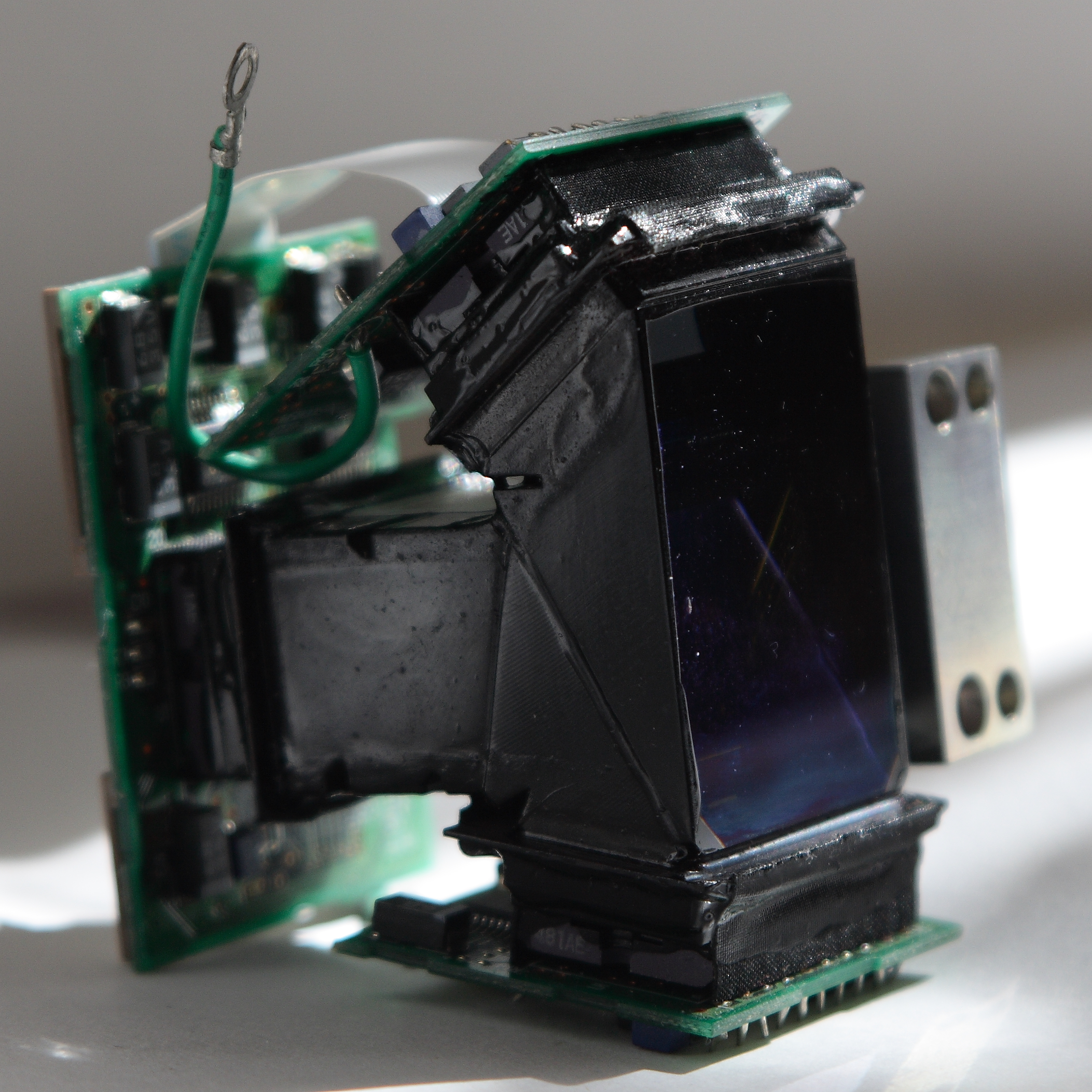
A 3CCD imaging block consisting of a color separation prism of Philips type on which three CCDs are mounted

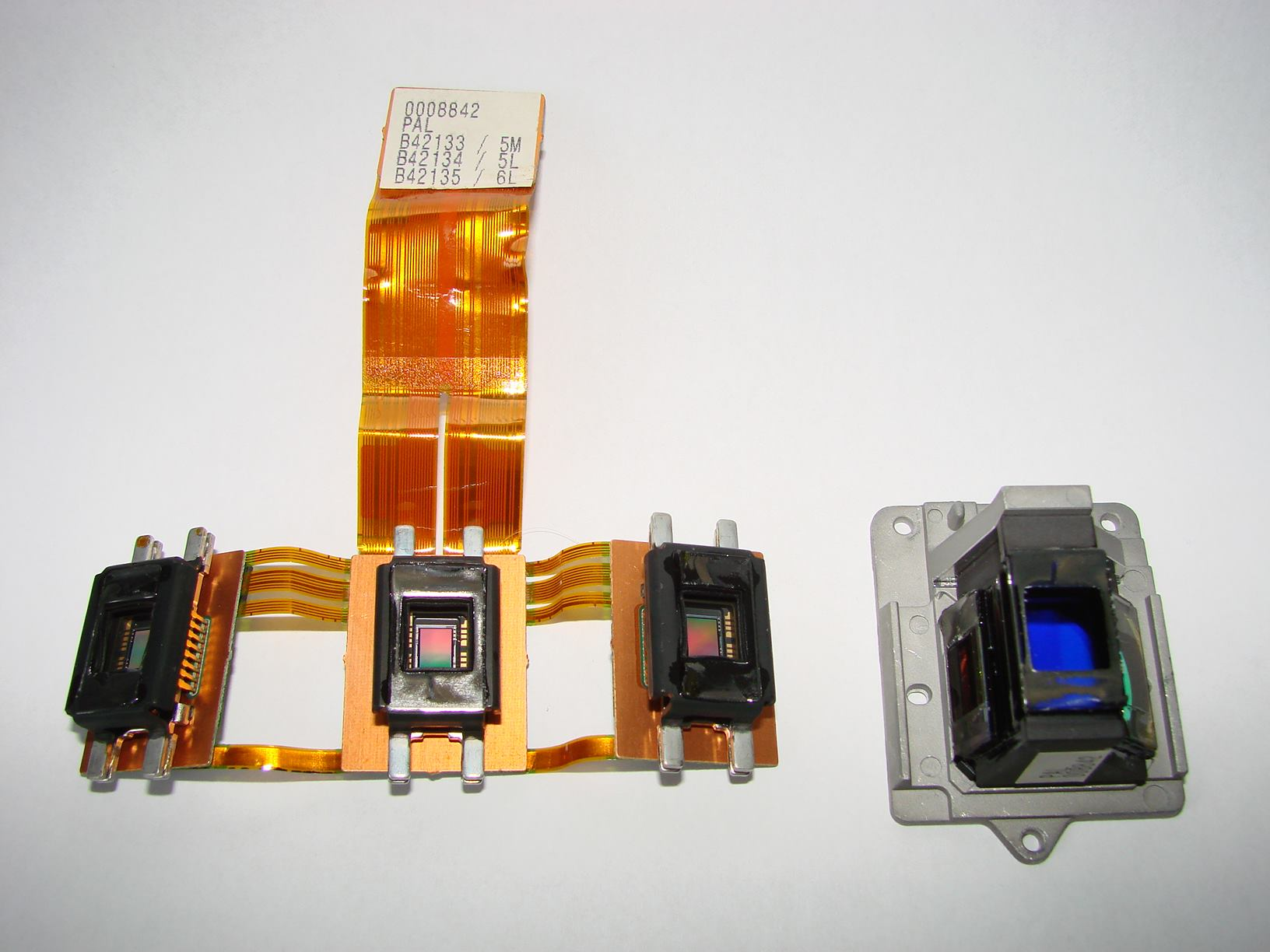
Three monochrome sensors and color separation prism from Sony DCR-VX100E camera

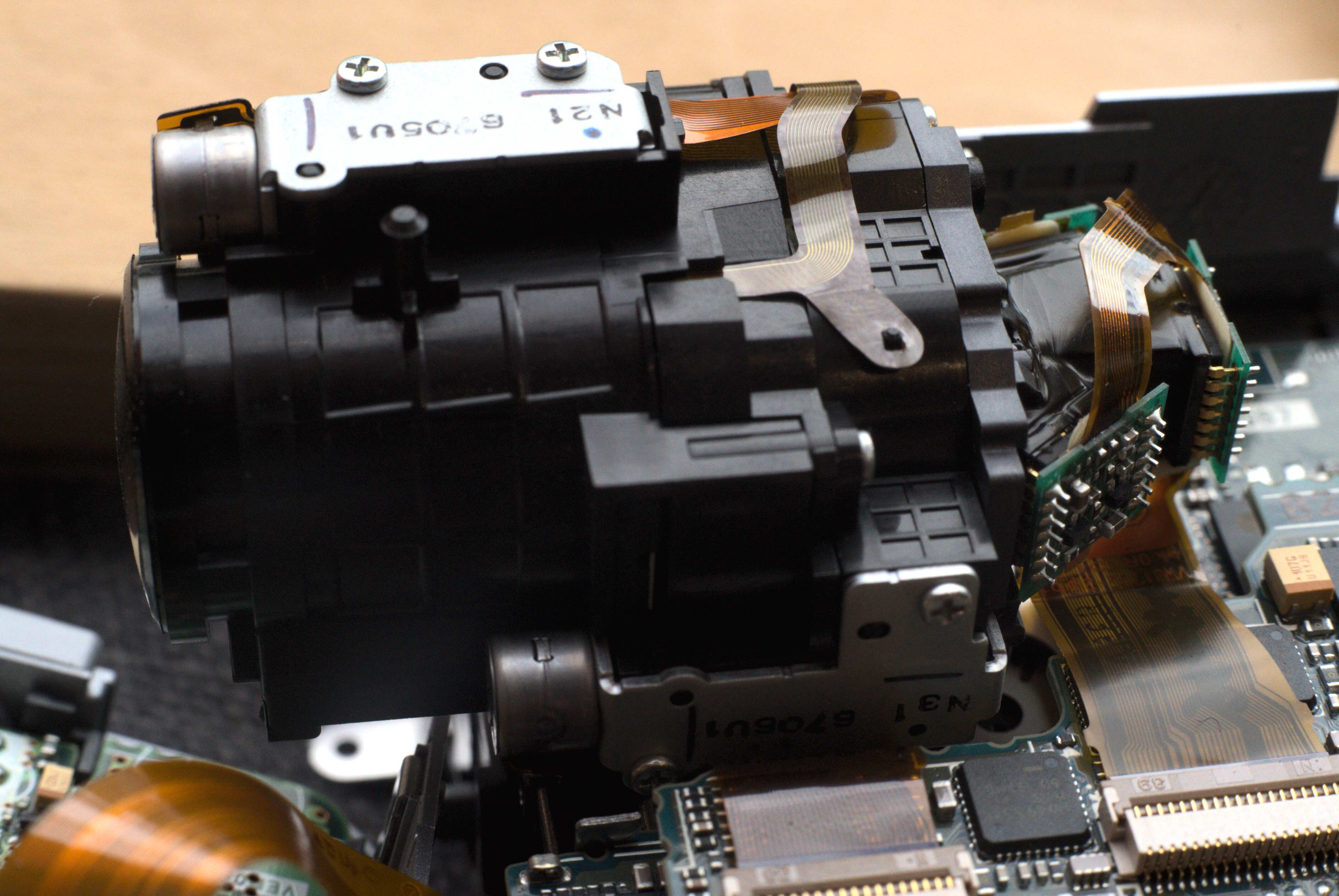
The Lens Unit from a Panasonic NV-GS300 consumer camcorder, employing three 1/6" monochrome CCD image sensors

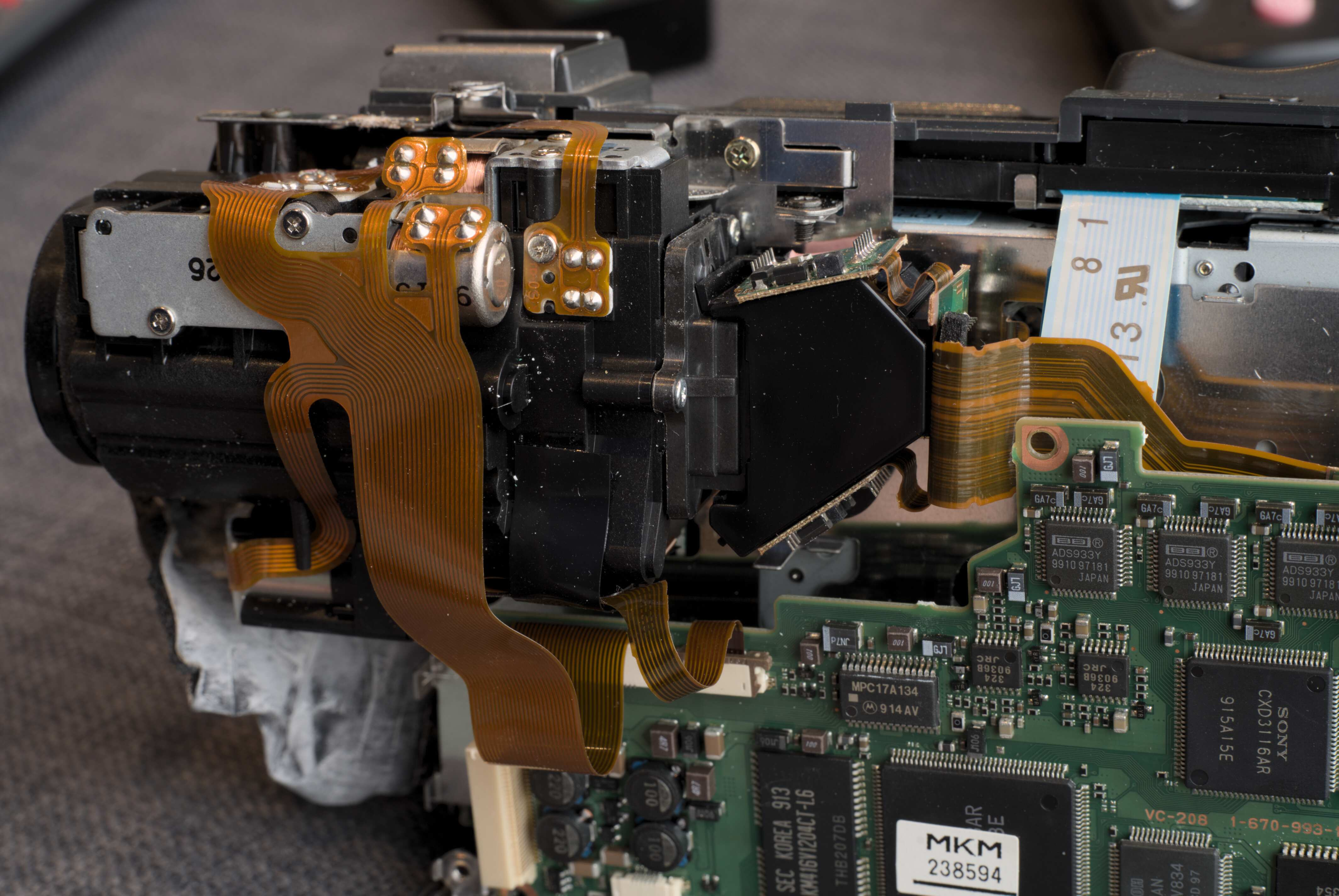
The Lens Unit from a Sony TRV-900 camcorder, showing lens assembly, external view of dichroic prism unit, and the three 1/4" monochrome CCDs. Also visible are three Burr Brown ADS933Y video ADC chips, one for each sensor

== See also ==
- Minolta RD-175 – Early DSLR camera that used three CCD sensors
- Thin-film optics
