= Optical film =

Optical film may refer to:

- Thin film optics, a branch of optics that deals with very thin structured layers of different materials
- Film, moving picture or movies
- Photographic film
