= Dichroism =

Reflecting only some colours of light

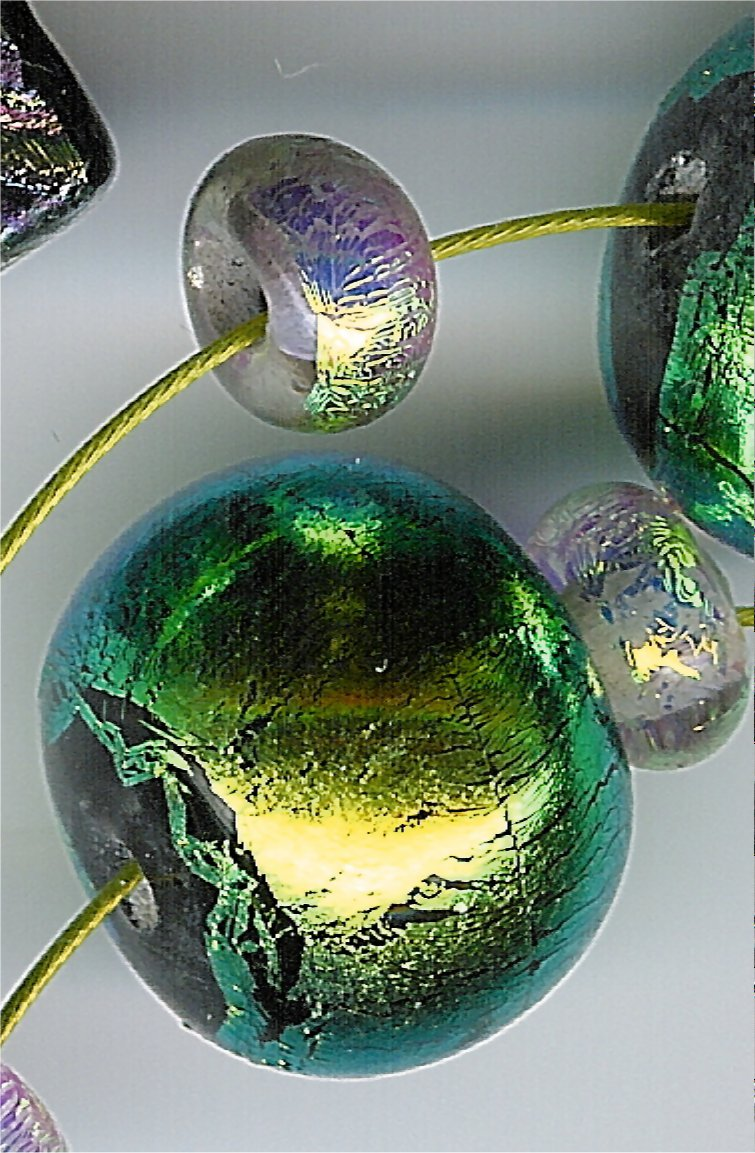
Lampworked dichroic glass bead

In optics, a dichroic material refers to:

- a material which causes visible light to be split up into two distinct beams of different wavelengths (colours), one of which is reflected and one of which is transmitted (not to be confused with dispersion), or
- a material in which light rays having different polarization directions are absorbed differently.

== Etymology ==
The term is derived from the Greek dichroos, meaning "two-colored," referring to the optical effect where a substance appears to have different colors when viewed from different angles or through different polarizations.

== Beam splitting (dielectric thin-film dichroism) ==
In the case of beam splitting, the original meaning of dichroic, from the Greek dikhroos, two-coloured, refers to any optical device which can split a beam of light into two beams with differing wavelengths. Such devices include mirrors and filters, usually treated with optical coatings, which are designed to reflect light over a certain range of wavelengths and transmit light which is outside that range. An example is the dichroic prism, used in some camcorders, which uses several coatings to split light into red, green and blue components for recording on separate CCD arrays, however it is now more common to have a Bayer filter to filter individual pixels on a single CCD array. This kind of dichroic device does not usually depend on the polarization of the light. The term dichromatic is also used in this sense.

=== Technological applications ===
- Dichroic Mirrors: Used in fluorescence microscopy and laser systems to separate excitation and emission light paths. Dichroic filters or mirrors use alternating layers of optical coatings with different refractive indices to produce thin-film interference. This allows specific wavelengths to be reflected while others are transmitted without being absorbed.
- Astronaut Helmets: Helmets used for extravehicular activity (EVA) are often coated with a thin layer of gold that acts as a dichroic filter, reflecting IR and UV radiation while remaining transparent to visible light.

== Anisotropic dichroism (polarized light) ==
In this case, the meaning of dichroic refers to the property of a material, in which light in different polarization states traveling through it experiences a different absorption coefficient; this is also known as diattenuation. When the polarization states in question are right and left-handed circular polarization, it is then known as circular dichroism (CD). Most materials exhibiting CD are chiral, although non-chiral materials showing CD have been recently observed. Since the left- and right-handed circular polarizations represent two spin angular momentum (SAM) states, in this case for a photon, this dichroism can also be thought of as spin angular momentum dichroism and could be modelled using quantum mechanics.

=== Pleochroism (crystal dichroism) ===
In mineralogy, certain crystals like tourmaline, kunzite, and iolite exhibit dichroism due to their anisotropic lattice structure. These crystals absorb light differently depending on the orientation of the light's polarization vector. This is more generally referred to as pleochroism, and the technique can be used in mineralogy to identify minerals.

In some crystals,, such as tourmaline, the strength of the dichroic effect varies strongly with the wavelength of the light, making them appear to have different colours when viewed with light having differing polarizations. In some materials, such as herapathite (iodoquinine sulfate) or Polaroid sheets, the effect is not strongly dependent on wavelength.

=== Circular dichroism (CD) ===
Circular dichroism is the differential absorption of left-handed ($LHC$) and right-handed ($RHC$) circularly polarized light.

- Biological Significance: CD spectroscopy is widely used in biochemistry to determine the secondary structure of proteins (e.g., alpha helix and beta sheet) and the folding properties of DNA.
- Magnetic Circular Dichroism (MCD): Induced by a magnetic field, MCD is used to study the electronic structure and magnetic properties of atoms and molecules.

=== Mathematical representation ===
The interaction of light with dichroic materials can be modeled using Jones calculus.

- Absorption Coefficient: The strength is defined by the difference in absorption coefficients ($\alpha_1$ and $\alpha_2$) along the material's principal axes.
- Dichroic Ratio: Defined as $D = \alpha_1 / \alpha_2$.

=== Natural examples ===
- Beetle elytra: The exoskeletons of certain scarab beetles, such as Chrysina resplendens, reflect circularly polarized light due to their specialized chitin layers.
- Chloroplasts: The ordered arrangement of chlorophyll within thylakoid membranes can exhibit dichroic properties during light harvesting.

=== Technological applications ===
- LCD Technology: Liquid-crystal displays use dichroic liquid crystals to modulate light and create images.

== See also ==
- Thin-film interference
- Birefringence
- Dichromatism
- Lycurgus Cup
- Pleochroism
