= Infitec =

Infitec GmbH
- Founded: 2003
- Headquarters: Gerstetten, (Baden-Württemberg, Germany)
- Key people: Helmut Jorke (managing director), Markus Fritz (managing director), Ingo Jorke (managing director), Ankit Upadhyay (Director of marketing and business development i4.0)
- Products: Components for 3D projection systems, Holography products
- Number of employees: 100 (2018)
- Website: infitec.net

Infitec GmbH is a family-owned company based in Gerstetten (District of Heidenheim, Baden-Württemberg, Germany) that develops, produces and markets products for the projection of 3D content. The registered name INFITEC is an acronym of Interference Filter Technology, which was invented and patented by the founder of the company, Helmut Jorke.

== Background ==
The INFITEC or Wavelength Multiplex Technology (WMT) is based on the fact that the visible light spectrum can be divided into different wavelength ranges using steep-edged optical filters. Some of these wavelength ranges are presented to the left eye, the others to the right eye. By an appropriate design of the transmission spectra of the filters it can be ensured that both eyes are reached by wavelengths in the red, green, and blue range of the visible light, so both eyes will see a fully colored image. Such multi-bandpass optical filters can currently be made only as so called interference filters. The WMT requires filters for the glasses as well as for the projectors (except laser projectors).

== History ==
=== Previous history ===
INFITEC GmbH emerged from a research project at the former DaimlerChrysler research center in Ulm, Germany. In this project it was studied under the name of wavelength multiplex visualization system, whether a new technical approach was suitable for an improved and functionally enhanced imaging in virtual reality systems. For the resulting technology based on interference filters the brand INFITEC was registered.

=== Foundation ===
In 2003, Helmut Jorke founded his own start-up enterprise called INFITEC GmbH. The aim was the utilization and further development of the INFITEC method. The head office was located in Ulm at that time.

=== Cooperation with Barco N.V. ===
The single-projector solution with INFITEC 3D filter wheel was developed in 2004 by the Belgian company Barco. The relevant patents by Barco were purchased by INFITEC GmbH in 2010.

=== Cooperation with Dolby Inc. ===
In 2006, the WMT was licensed to the American company Dolby Laboratories, Inc. for digital cinema, and it was marketed under the name Dolby 3D. As Dolby uses different wavelength ranges than INFITEC, Dolby glasses are not compatible with projectors equipped with INFITEC filters, and vice versa.

=== New filter generation ===
In 2011, INFITEC introduced a new generation of filters under the designation Excellence in 3D. By a new design of the transmission bands of the filters a balanced color impression for both eyes is achieved. Before, an elaborate color correction was needed for both stereoscopic channels that partially required special video processors. Now, if necessary at all, the simple color adjustment included in many projectors is sufficient.

== Operating establishments ==
In 2010, the production of 3D glasses as well as the administration was relocated from Ulm to Gerstetten (District of Heidenheim, Baden-Württemberg, Germany). Since 2013, INFITEC GmbH runs a sales office in the United States. In 2014, INFITEC GmbH acquired a 50% share of VisionOptics GmbH in Chemnitz (Saxony, Germany). The headquarters, the sales department, and the research and development department of INFITEC GmbH moved from Ulm to Gerstetten in 2015. Global-offices include Russia, China, and USA.

== Business activity ==
INFITEC GmbH develops, manufactures and markets interference filters for 3D projection technology and glasses fitted with these filters. In some cases the retrofitting of filters to projectors is done as well. INFITEC GmbH is internationally active regarding purchase and sales. The INFITEC GmbH holds all patents and licensing rights (aside from the cinema market held by Dolby Inc.) from simulation in industry and research institutes, planetariums and museums, to large venue events, theme parks, and home cinema solutions.
