= Optical coating =

Material which alters light reflection or transmission on optics

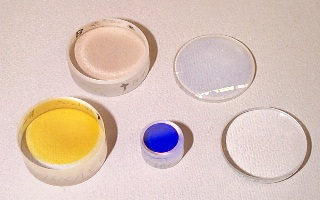
Optically coated mirrors and lenses

An optical coating is one or more thin layers of material deposited on an optical component such as a lens, prism or mirror, which alters the way in which the optic reflects and transmits light. These coatings have become a key technology in the field of optics. One type of optical coating is an anti-reflection coating, which reduces unwanted reflections from surfaces, and is commonly used on spectacle and camera lenses. Another type is the high-reflective (HR) coating, which can be used to produce mirrors that reflect greater than 99.99% of the light that falls on them. More complex optical coatings exhibit high reflection over some range of wavelengths, and anti-reflection over another range, allowing the production of dichroic thin-film filters.

== Types of coating ==
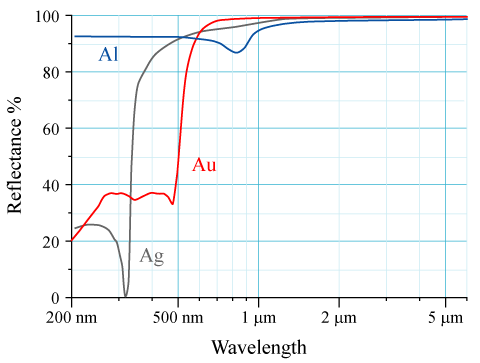
Reflectance vs. wavelength curves for aluminium (Al), silver (Ag), and gold (Au) metal mirrors at normal incidence

The simplest optical coatings are thin layers of metals, such as aluminium, which are deposited on glass substrates to make mirror surfaces, a process known as silvering. The metal used determines the reflection characteristics of the mirror; aluminium is the cheapest and most common coating, and yields a reflectivity of around 88%-92% over the visible spectrum. More expensive is silver, which has a reflectivity of 95%-99% even into the far infrared, but suffers from decreasing reflectivity (<90%) in the blue and ultraviolet spectral regions. Most expensive is gold, which gives excellent (98%-99%) reflectivity throughout the infrared, but limited reflectivity at wavelengths shorter than 550 nm, resulting in the typical gold colour.

By controlling the thickness and density of metal coatings, it is possible to decrease the reflectivity and increase the transmission of the surface, resulting in a half-silvered mirror. These are sometimes used as "one-way mirrors".

The other major type of optical coating is the dielectric coating (i.e. using materials with a different refractive index to the substrate). These are constructed from thin layers of materials such as magnesium fluoride, calcium fluoride, and various metal oxides, which are deposited onto the optical substrate. By careful choice of the exact composition, thickness, and number of these layers, it is possible to tailor the reflectivity and transmitivity of the coating to produce almost any desired characteristic. Reflection coefficients of surfaces can be reduced to less than 0.2%, producing an antireflection (AR) coating. Conversely, the reflectivity can be increased to greater than 99.99%, producing a high-reflector (HR) coating. The level of reflectivity can also be tuned to any particular value, for instance to produce a mirror that reflects 90% and transmits 10% of the light that falls on it, over some range of wavelengths. Such mirrors are often used as beamsplitters, and as output couplers in lasers. Alternatively, the coating can be designed such that the mirror reflects light only in a narrow band of wavelengths, producing an optical filter.

The versatility of dielectric coatings leads to their use in many scientific optical instruments (such as lasers, optical microscopes, refracting telescopes, and interferometers) as well as consumer devices such as binoculars, spectacles, and photographic lenses.

Dielectric layers are sometimes applied over top of metal films, either to provide a protective layer (as in silicon dioxide over aluminium), or to enhance the reflectivity of the metal film. Metal and dielectric combinations are also used to make advanced coatings that cannot be made any other way. One example is the so-called "perfect mirror", which exhibits high (but not perfect) reflection, with unusually low sensitivity to wavelength, angle, and polarization.

=== Antireflection coatings ===
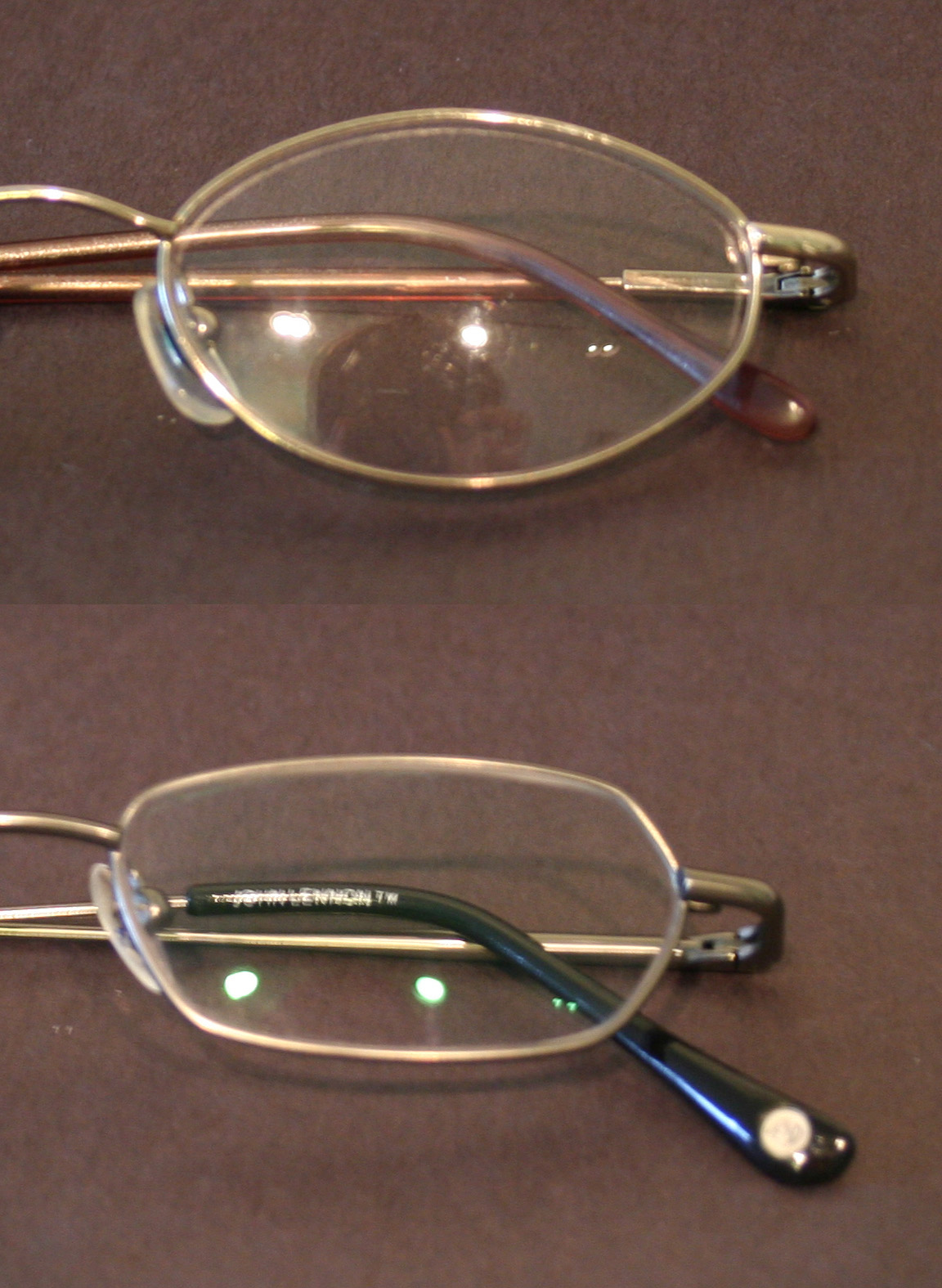
Comparison of uncoated glasses (top) and glasses with an anti-reflective coating (bottom).

Antireflection coatings are used to reduce reflection from surfaces. Whenever a ray of light moves from one medium to another (such as when light enters a sheet of glass after travelling through air), some portion of the light is reflected from the surface (known as the interface) between the two media.

A number of different effects are used to reduce reflection. The simplest is to use a thin layer of material at the interface, with an index of refraction between those of the two media. The reflection is minimized when

$$n_1 = \sqrt{n_0 n_S}$$,

where $n_1$ is the index of the thin layer, and $n_0$ and $n_S$ are the indices of the two media. The optimum refractive indices for multiple coating layers at angles of incidence other than 0° is given by Moreno et al. (2005).

Such coatings can reduce the reflection for ordinary glass from about 4% per surface to around 2%. These were the first type of antireflection coating known, having been discovered by Lord Rayleigh in 1886. He found that old, slightly tarnished pieces of glass transmitted more light than new, clean pieces due to this effect.

Practical antireflection coatings rely on an intermediate layer not only for its direct reduction of reflection coefficient, but also use the interference effect of a thin layer. If the layer's thickness is controlled precisely such that it is exactly one-quarter of the wavelength of the light in the layer (a quarter-wave coating), the reflections from the front and back sides of the thin layer will destructively interfere and cancel each other.

Interference in a quarter-wave antireflection coating

In practice, the performance of a simple one-layer interference coating is limited by the fact that the reflections only exactly cancel for one wavelength of light at one angle, and by difficulties finding suitable materials. For ordinary glass (n≈1.5), the optimum coating index is n≈1.23. Few useful substances have the required refractive index. Magnesium fluoride (MgF_{2}) is often used, since it is hard-wearing and can be easily applied to substrates using physical vapour deposition, even though its index is higher than desirable (n=1.38). With such coatings, reflection as low as 1% can be achieved on common glass, and better results can be obtained on higher index media.

Further reduction is possible by using multiple coating layers, designed such that reflections from the surfaces undergo maximum destructive interference. By using two or more layers, broadband antireflection coatings which cover the visible range (400-700 nm) with maximum reflectivities of less than 0.5% are commonly achievable. Reflection in narrower wavelength bands can be as low as 0.1%. Alternatively, a series of layers with small differences in refractive index can be used to create a broadband antireflective coating by means of a refractive index gradient.

=== High-reflection coatings ===
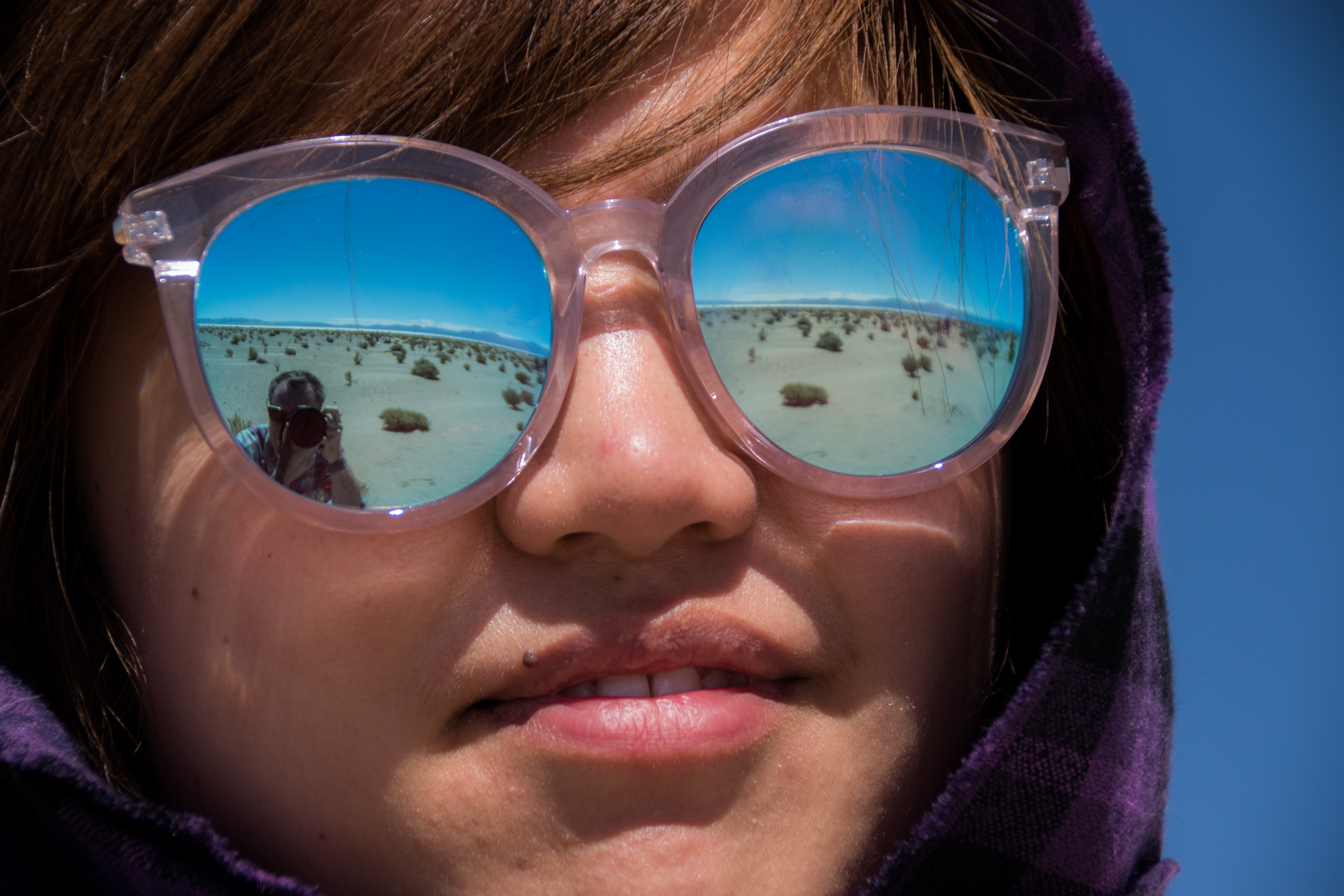
A woman wears sunglasses featuring a highly reflective optical coating

Diagram of a dielectric mirror. Thin layers with a high refractive index n_{1} are interleaved with thicker layers with a lower refractive index n_{2}. The path lengths l_{A} and l_{B} differ by exactly one wavelength, which leads to constructive interference.

High-reflection (HR) coatings work the opposite way to antireflection coatings. The general idea is usually based on the periodic layer system composed from two materials, one with a high index, such as zinc sulfide (n=2.32) or titanium dioxide (n=2.4), and one with a low index, such as magnesium fluoride (n=1.38) or silicon dioxide (n=1.49). This periodic system significantly enhances the reflectivity of the surface in the certain wavelength range called band-stop, whose width is determined by the ratio of the two used indices only (for quarter-wave systems), while the maximum reflectivity increases up to almost 100% with a number of layers in the stack. The thicknesses of the layers are generally quarter-wave (then they yield to the broadest high reflection band in comparison to the non-quarter-wave systems composed from the same materials), this time designed such that reflected beams constructively interfere with one another to maximize reflection and minimize transmission. The best of these coatings built-up from deposited dielectric lossless materials on perfectly smooth surfaces can reach reflectivities greater than 99.999% (over a fairly narrow range of wavelengths). Common HR coatings can achieve 99.9% reflectivity over a broad wavelength range (tens of nanometers in the visible spectrum range).

As for AR coatings, HR coatings are affected by the incidence angle of the light. When used away from normal incidence, the reflective range shifts to shorter wavelengths, and becomes polarization dependent. This effect can be exploited to produce coatings that polarize a light beam.

By manipulating the exact thickness and composition of the layers in the reflective stack, the reflection characteristics can be tuned to a particular application, and may incorporate both high-reflective and anti-reflective wavelength regions. The coating can be designed as a long- or short-pass filter, a bandpass or notch filter, or a mirror with a specific reflectivity (useful in lasers). For example, the dichroic prism assembly used in some cameras requires two dielectric coatings, one long-wavelength pass filter reflecting light below 500 nm (to separate the blue component of the light), and one short-pass filter to reflect red light, above 600 nm wavelength. The remaining transmitted light is the green component.

==== Extreme ultraviolet coatings ====
In the EUV portion of the spectrum (wavelengths shorter than about 30 nm) nearly all materials absorb strongly, making it difficult to focus or otherwise manipulate light in this wavelength range. Telescopes such as TRACE or EIT that form images with EUV light use multilayer mirrors that are constructed of hundreds of alternating layers of a high-mass metal such as molybdenum or tungsten, and a low-mass spacer such as silicon, vacuum deposited onto a substrate such as glass. Each layer pair is designed to have a thickness equal to half the wavelength of light to be reflected. Constructive interference between scattered light from each layer causes the mirror to reflect EUV light of the desired wavelength as would a normal metal mirror in visible light. Using multilayer optics it is possible to reflect up to 70% of incident EUV light (at a particular wavelength chosen when the mirror is constructed).

=== Transparent conductive coatings ===
Transparent conductive coatings are used in applications where it is important that the coating conduct electricity or dissipate static charge. Conductive coatings are used to protect the aperture from electromagnetic interference, while dissipative coatings are used to prevent the build-up of static electricity. Transparent conductive coatings are also used extensively to provide electrodes in situations where light is required to pass, for example in flat panel display technologies and in many photoelectrochemical experiments. A common substance used in transparent conductive coatings is indium tin oxide (ITO). ITO is not very optically transparent, however. The layers must be thin to provide substantial transparency, particularly at the blue end of the spectrum. Using ITO, sheet resistances of 20 to 10,000 ohms per square can be achieved. An ITO coating may be combined with an antireflective coating to further improve transmittance. Other TCOs (Transparent Conductive Oxides) include AZO (Aluminium doped Zinc Oxide), which offers much better UV transmission than ITO. A special class of transparent conductive coatings applies to infrared films for theater-air military optics where IR transparent windows need to have (Radar) stealth (Stealth technology) properties. These are known as RAITs (Radar Attenuating / Infrared Transmitting) and include materials such as boron doped DLC (Diamond-like carbon).

=== Phase correction coatings ===
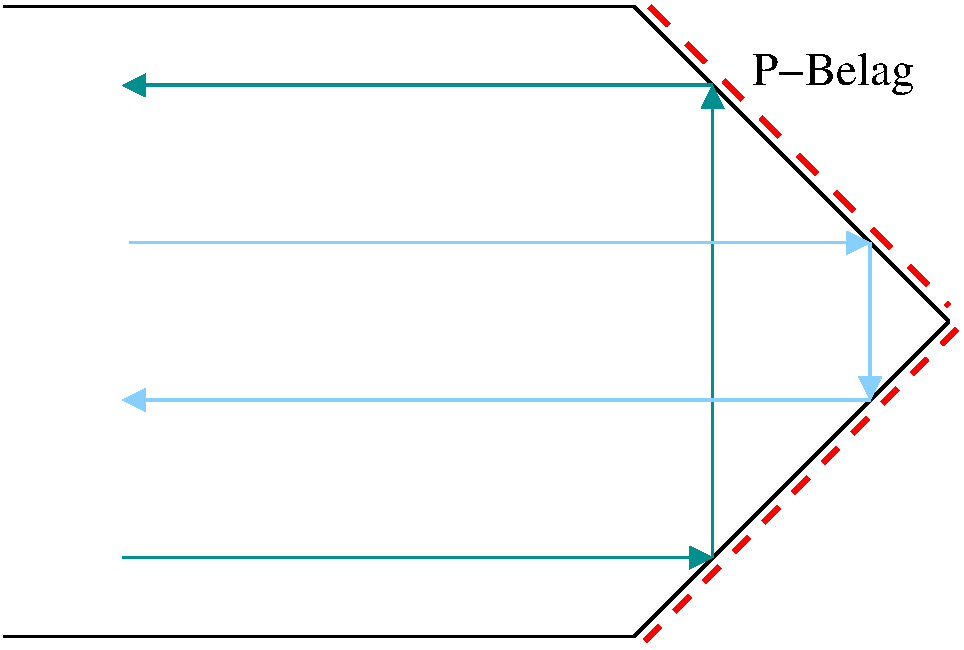
Beam path at the roof edge (cross-section); the P-coating layer is on both roof surfaces

The multiple internal reflections in roof prisms cause a polarization-dependent phase-lag of the transmitted light, in a manner similar to a Fresnel rhomb. This must be suppressed by multilayer phase-correction coatings applied to one of the roof surfaces to avoid unwanted interference effects and a loss of contrast in the image. Dielectric phase-correction prism coatings are applied in a vacuum chamber with maybe 30 different superimposed vapor coating layers deposits, making it a complex production process.

In a roof prism without a phase-correcting coating, s-polarized and p-polarized light each acquire a different geometric phase as they pass through the upper prism. When the two polarized components are recombined, interference between the s-polarized and p-polarized light results in a different intensity distribution perpendicular to the roof edge as compared to that along the roof edge. This effect reduces contrast and resolution in the image perpendicular to the roof edge, producing an inferior image compared to that from a porro prism erecting system. This roof edge diffraction effect may also be seen as a diffraction spike perpendicular to the roof edge generated by bright points in the image. In technical optics, such a phase is also known as the Pancharatnam phase, and in quantum physics an equivalent phenomenon is known as the Berry phase.

This effect can be seen in the elongation of the Airy disk in the direction perpendicular to the crest of the roof as this is a diffraction from the discontinuity at the roof crest.

The unwanted interference effects are suppressed by vapour-depositing a special dielectric coating known as a phase-compensating coating on the roof surfaces of the roof prism. These phase-correction coating or P-coating on the roof surfaces was developed in 1988 by Adolf Weyrauch at Carl Zeiss Other manufacturers followed soon, and since then phase-correction coatings are used across the board in medium and high-quality roof prism binoculars. This coating corrects for the difference in geometric phase between s- and p-polarized light so both have effectively the same phase shift, preventing image-degrading interference.

From a technical point of view, the phase-correction coating layer does not correct the actual phase shift, but rather the partial polarization of the light that results from total reflection. Such a correction can always only be made for a selected wavelength and for a specific angle of incidence; however, it is possible to approximately correct a roof prism for polychromatic light by superimposing several layers. In this way, since the 1990s, roof prism binoculars have also achieved resolution values that were previously only achievable with porro prisms. The presence of a phase-correction coating can be checked on unopened binoculars using two polarization filters.

=== Fano-resonant optical coatings ===
Fano-resonant optical coatings (FROCs) represent a new category of optical coatings. FROCs exhibit the photonic Fano resonance by coupling a broadband nanocavity, which serves as the continuum, with a narrowband Fabry–Perot nanocavity, representing the discrete state. The interference between these two resonances manifests as an asymmetric Fano-resonance line-shape. FROCs are considered a separate category of optical coatings because they enjoy optical properties that cannot be reproduced using other optical coatings. Mainly, semi-transparent FROCs act as a beam splitting filter that reflects and transmits the same color, a property that cannot be achieved with transmission filters, dielectric mirrors, or semi-transparent metals.

FROCs enjoy remarkable structural coloring properties, as they can produce colors across a wide color gamut with both high brightness and high purity. Moreover, the dependence of color on the angle of incident light can be controlled through the dielectric cavity material, making FROCs adaptable for applications requiring either angle-independent or angle-dependent coloring. This includes decorative purposes and anti-counterfeit measures.

FROCs were used as both monolithic spectrum splitters and selective solar absorbers, which makes them suitable for hybrid solar-thermal energy generation. They can be designed to reflect specific wavelength ranges, aligning with the energy band gap of photovoltaic cells, while absorbing the remaining solar spectrum. This enables higher photovoltaic efficiency at elevated optical concentrations by reducing the photovoltaic's cell temperature. The reduced temperature also increases the cell's lifetime. Additionally, their low infrared emissivity minimizes thermal losses, increasing the system's overall optothermal efficiency.

== Sources ==
- Hecht, Eugene. Chapter 9, Optics, 2nd ed. (1990), Addison Wesley. ISBN 0-201-11609-X.
- I. Moreno, et al., "Thin-film spatial filters", Optics Letters, 30, 914–916 (2005), doi:10.1364/OL.30.000914.
- C. Clark, et al., "Two-color Mach 3 IR coating for TAMD systems", Proc. SPIE, vol. 4375, p. 307–314 (2001), doi:10.1117/12.439189.

== See also ==
- List of telescope parts and construction
