= Sony DCR-VX1000 =

Digital camcorder model

The Sony DCR-VX1000 was a DV camcorder released by Sony in 1995. It was the first to use both the MiniDV tape format with three-CCD sensors, boasting twice the horizontal resolution of VHS and superior colour reproduction, light sensitivity, and image sharpness than single-CCD DV cameras. It was also the first consumer camcorder with the ability to transfer video information via Firewire to an ordinary Windows or Macintosh computer. Together with the rival Canon XL1 and shorter-lived "budget" three-CCD DV models like the Canon GL1 and Sony DCR-TRV900, the VX1000 revolutionized desktop video production in the late 1990s, delivering quality comparable to then-dominant analog Betacam hardware at a fraction of the cost.

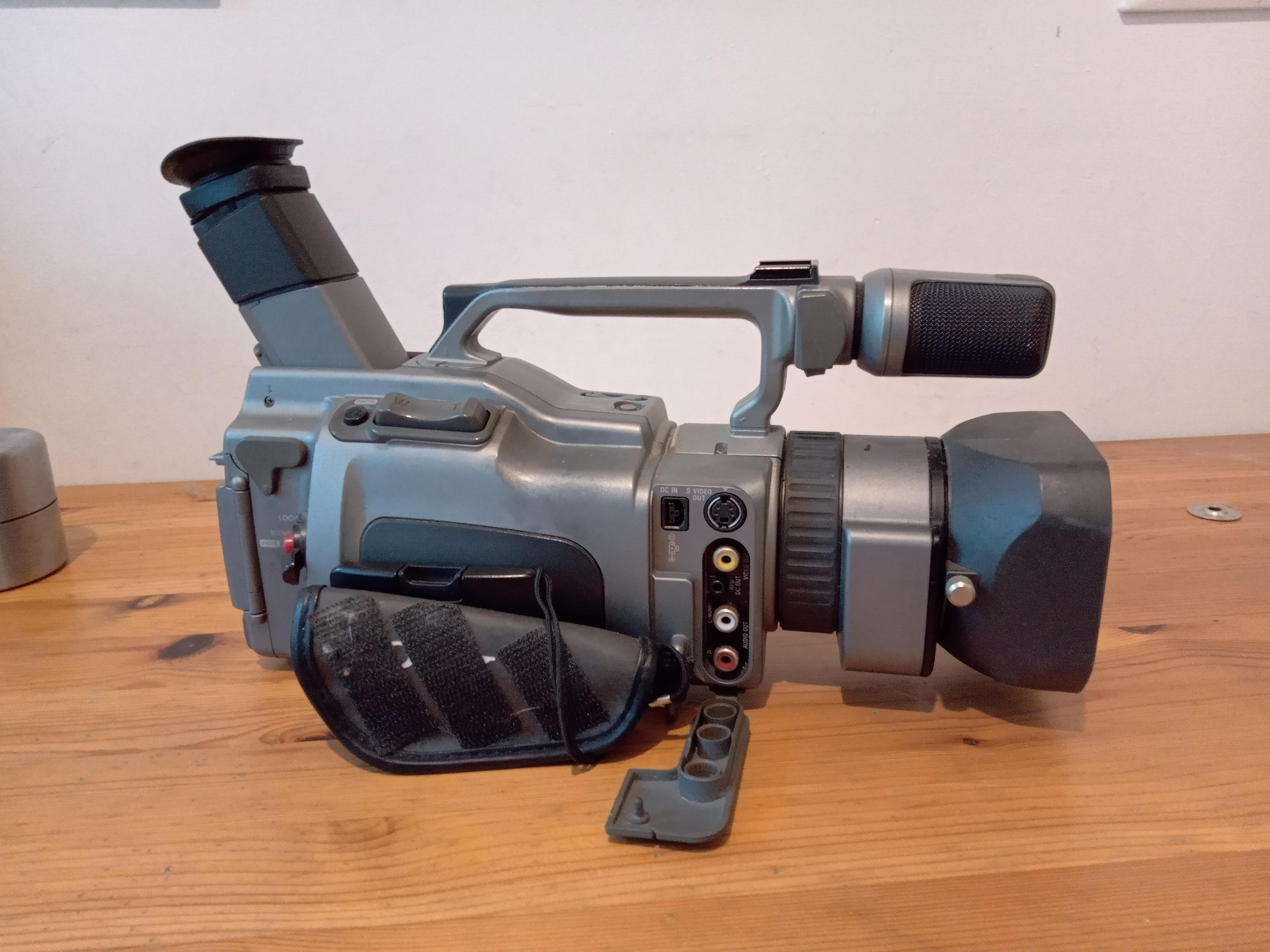
Sony DCR-VX1000 digital video camera

== History ==
The VX1000 was based on Sony's earlier VX1 (PAL) and VX3 (NTSC) Hi8 camcorders, which were similarly intended as "prosumer" models, targeted at both high-end consumer and low-end professional users. In the mid-1990s, Sony began to move away from Hi8 tape in favor of the emerging DV format, and as a result the VX3 and VX1 were discontinued in 1995. However, their iconic form factor, with a distinctively-shaped stereo microphone array at the front of the handle, was reused by the VX1000 and numerous later Sony DV and HDV camcorders in the VX, PD, FX and Z lines. The camera's MSRP was USD $3000 when it came out. With three 1/3-inch CCDs, a digital sensor resolution of 410,000 pixels, and an analog horizontal resolution of better than 530 lines, its resolution and video clarity were nearly unsurpassed, even by models far past its price point.

At the time, Sony had a pattern of releasing "professional" upgraded versions of their most popular consumer cameras, with the same chassis shape but made from more durable materials and in a darker color. Extra features included XLR inputs and the ability to record in the higher-grade DVCAM format. The VX1000 was replaced by the DCR-VX2000 in 2000 and the DCR-VX2100 in mid 2003; the VX2000's pro version was the DSR-PD150, notably used in the production of David Lynch's 2006 feature film Inland Empire, and the VX2100's pro versions were the DSR-PD170 and DSR-PD175. The VX1000 itself, however, had no exact pro equivalent, although the shoulder-mounted VX9000 and DSR200 (with "A" and "P" variants) used the same 3ccd sensor chips and lens, along with fullsize DV tapes instead of MiniDV.

== Impact ==
The introduction of the camera had an immediate impact on TV news journalism and documentary production. In the UK, filmmaker Chris Terrill was the first mainstream filmmaker to experiment with the VX1000 in the mid 1990s when he made Soho Stories for the BBC; the series won the Royal Television Society Award for Innovation. In the US, the arts and culture show City Arts on PBS station Channel Thirteen, under producer Jeff Folmsbee, became the first regularly scheduled program shot with the VX1000, and would go on to receive numerous regional Emmy awards and nominations, and a national Peabody Award in 1997.

The DCR-VX1000 became iconic for its use in skateboarding films in the late '90s and early 2000s and therefore is an important part in the history of skateboarding culture. Porn producer John Stagliano credits the camera with also revolutionising the video pornography industry: “With the quality and ease of use, people who had been actors could shoot and people who had good ideas could shoot. So you had people who were into porn shooting porn.”

== Notable productions ==
- Discovery Channel - Travelers (1996-1998).
- British hidden camera show Trigger Happy TV.
- Lars von Trier's film The Idiots was filmed using the Sony DCR-VX1000.
- Spike Lee's 2000 film Bamboozled was filmed using the VX1000 for most of the runtime.
