= Dichroic prism =

Prism that splits light into two beams

A trichroic prism assembly

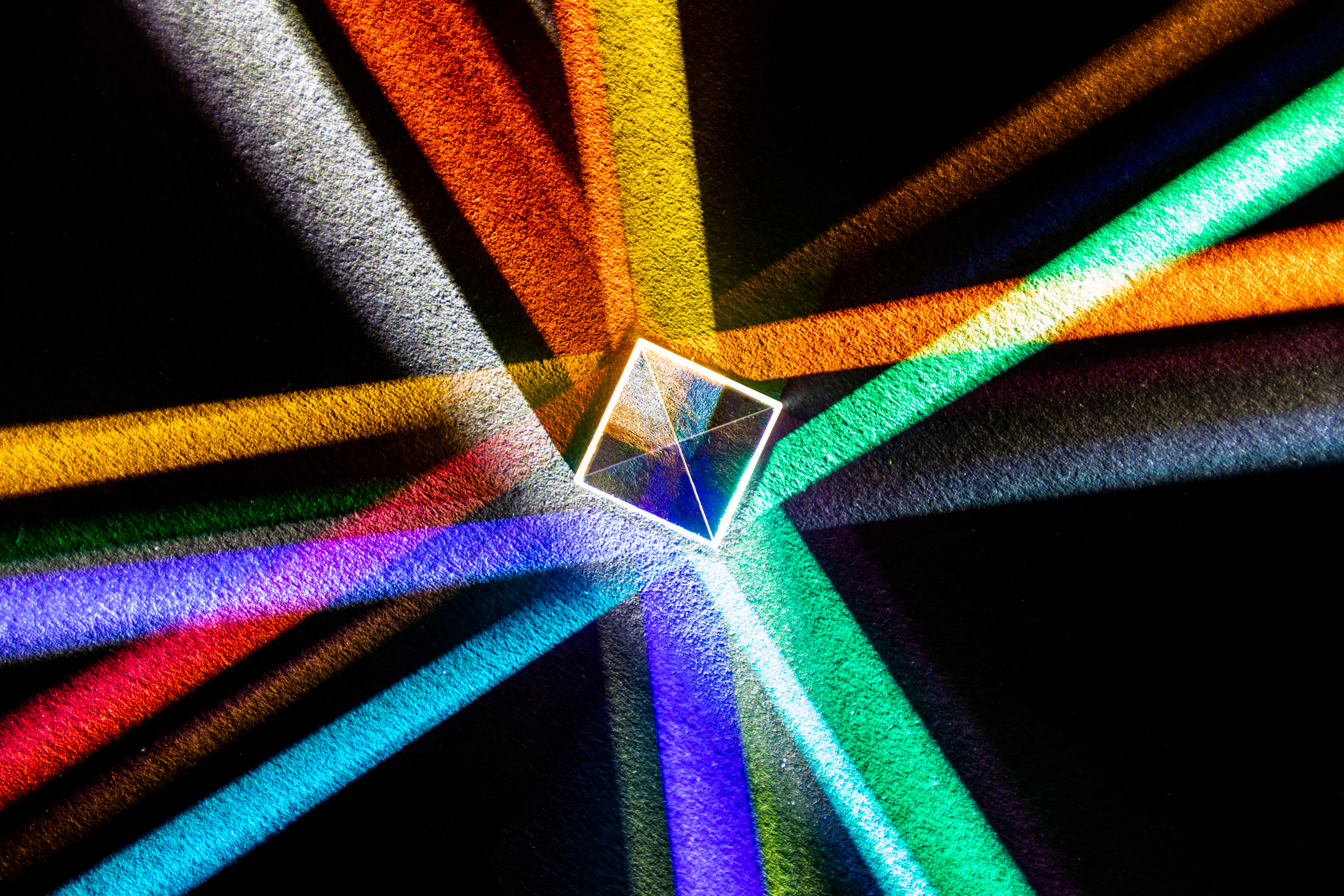
Dichroic prism

A dichroic prism is a prism that splits light into two beams of differing wavelengths (colour). A trichroic prism assembly combines two dichroic prisms to split an image into 3 colours, typically as red, green and blue of the RGB colour model. They are usually constructed of one or more glass prisms with dichroic optical coatings that selectively reflect or transmit light depending on the light's wavelength. That is, certain surfaces within the prism act as dichroic filters. These are used as beam splitters in many optical instruments. (See: Dichroism, for the etymology of the term.)

== Applications in camcorders or digital cameras ==
One common application of dichroic prisms is in some camcorders and high-quality digital cameras. A trichroic prism assembly is a combination of two dichroic prisms which are used to split an image into red, green, and blue components, which can be separately detected on three CCD arrays.

A possible layout for the device is shown in the diagram. A light beam enters the first prism (A), and the blue component of the beam is reflected from a low-pass filter coating (F_{1}) that reflects blue light (high-frequency), but transmits longer wavelengths (lower frequencies). The blue beam undergoes total internal reflection from the front of prism A and exits it through a side face. The remainder of the beam enters the second prism (B) and is split by a second filter coating (F_{2}) which reflects red light but transmits shorter wavelengths. The red beam is also totally internally reflected due to a small air-gap between prisms A and B. The remaining green component of the beam travels through prism C.

The trichroic prism assembly can be used in reverse to combine red, green and blue beams into a coloured image, and is used in this way in some projector devices. Assemblies with more than 3 beams are possible.

== Advantages of dichroic prism color separation ==
When used for color separation, in an imaging system, this method has some advantages over other methods, such as the use of a Bayer filter. Most of those characteristics derive from the usage of dichroic filters and are in common with those. The advantages include:

- Minimal light absorption, most of the light is directed to one of the output beams.
- Better color separation than with most other filters.
- Easy to fabricate for any combination of pass bands.
- Does not require color interpolation (demosaicing) and thus avoids all of the false color artifacts commonly seen in demosaiced images.

== Disadvantages of dichroic prism color separation ==
- Since dichroic prisms use dichroic filters, the exact bandpass of each filter depends on the light incidence angle.
- Maximum lens numerical aperture might be restricted due to the geometry of the optical path inside the assembly.
- The exact bandpass depends on the lens numerical aperture, since this factor changes the average light incidence angle in the filters.
- Since some of the glass surfaces are at an angle against the incident beam some polarization by reflection effects can result.

== See also ==
- Thin-film optics
- Three-CCD camera
- DLP projector
