= Interference filter =

Wavelength-selective optical filter

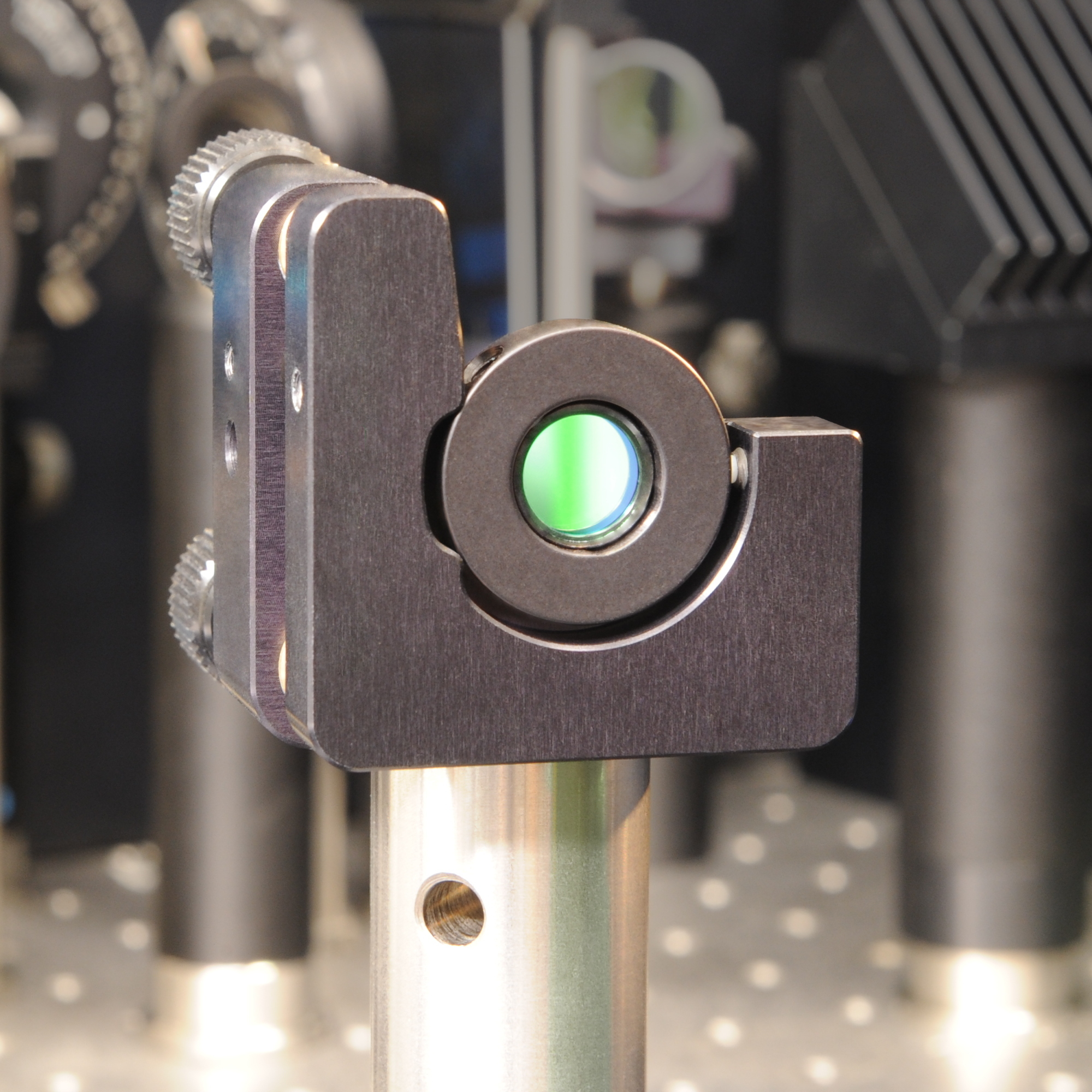
Band-pass interference filter for laser experiments

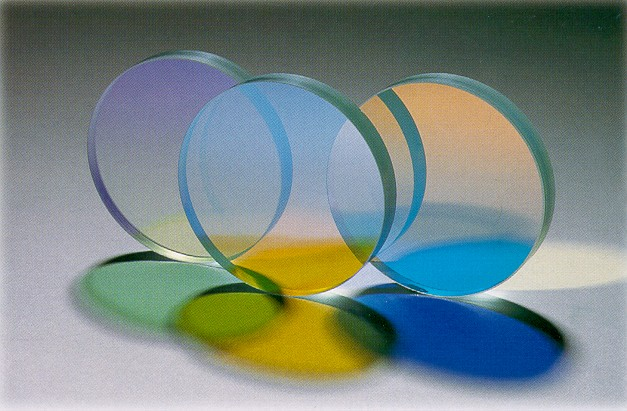
Dichroic filters

An interference filter, dichroic filter, or thin-film filter is an optical filter that reflects some wavelengths (colors) of light and transmits others, with almost no absorption for all wavelengths of interest. An interference filter may be high-pass, low-pass, bandpass, or band-rejection. They are used in scientific applications, as well as in architectural and theatrical lighting.

An interference filter consists of multiple thin layers of dielectric material having different refractive indices. There may also be metallic layers. Interference filters are wavelength-selective by virtue of the interference effects that take place between the incident and reflected waves at the thin-film boundaries. The principle of operation is similar to a Fabry-Perot etalon.

Dichroic mirrors and dichroic reflectors are the same type of device, but are characterized by the colors of light that they reflect, rather than the colors they pass. Dielectric mirrors operate on the same principle, but focus exclusively on reflection.

== Theory ==
Dichroic filters use the principle of thin-film interference, and produce colors in the same way as oil films on water. When light strikes an oil film at an angle, some of the light is reflected from the top surface of the oil, and some is reflected from the bottom surface where it is in contact with the water. Because the light reflecting from the bottom travels a slightly longer path, some light wavelengths are reinforced by this delay, while others tend to be canceled, producing the colors seen. The color transmitted by the filter exhibits a blue shift with increasing angle of incidence, see Dielectric mirror.

In a dichroic mirror or filter, instead of using an oil film to produce the interference, alternating layers of optical coatings with different refractive indices are built up upon a glass substrate. The interfaces between the layers of different refractive index produce phased reflections, selectively reinforcing certain wavelengths of light and interfering with other wavelengths. The layers are usually added by vacuum deposition. By controlling the thickness and number of the layers, the frequency of the passband of the filter can be tuned and made as wide or narrow as desired. Because unwanted wavelengths are reflected rather than absorbed, dichroic filters do not absorb this unwanted energy during operation and so do not become nearly as hot as the equivalent conventional filter (which attempts to absorb all energy except for that in the passband). (See Fabry–Pérot interferometer for a mathematical description of the effect.)

Where white light is being deliberately separated into various color bands (for example, within a color video projector or color television camera), the similar dichroic prism is used instead. For cameras, however, it is now more common to have an absorption filter array to filter individual pixels on a single CCD array.

== Applications ==
Dichroic filters can filter light from a white light source to produce light that is perceived by humans to be highly saturated in color. Such filters are popular in architectural and theatrical applications.

IEC 60598 No Cool Beam symbol

Dichroic reflectors known as cold mirrors are commonly used behind a light source to reflect visible light forward while allowing the invisible infrared light to pass out of the rear of the fixture. Such an arrangement allows intense illumination with less heating of the illuminated object. Many quartz-halogen lamps have an integrated dichroic reflector for this purpose, being originally designed for use in slide projectors to avoid melting the slides, but now widely used for interior home and commercial lighting. This improves whiteness by removing excess red; however, it poses a serious fire hazard if used in recessed or enclosed luminaires by allowing infrared radiation into those luminaires. For these applications non-cool-beam (ALU or Silverback) lamps must be used. Recessed or enclosed luminaires that are unsuitable for use with dichroic reflector lights can be identified by the IEC 60598 No Cool Beam symbol.

In fluorescence microscopy, dichroic filters are used as beam splitters to direct illumination of an excitation frequency toward the sample and then at an analyzer to reject that same excitation frequency but pass a particular emission frequency.

Some LCD projectors use dichroic filters instead of prisms to split the white light from the lamp into the three colours before passing it through the three LCD units.

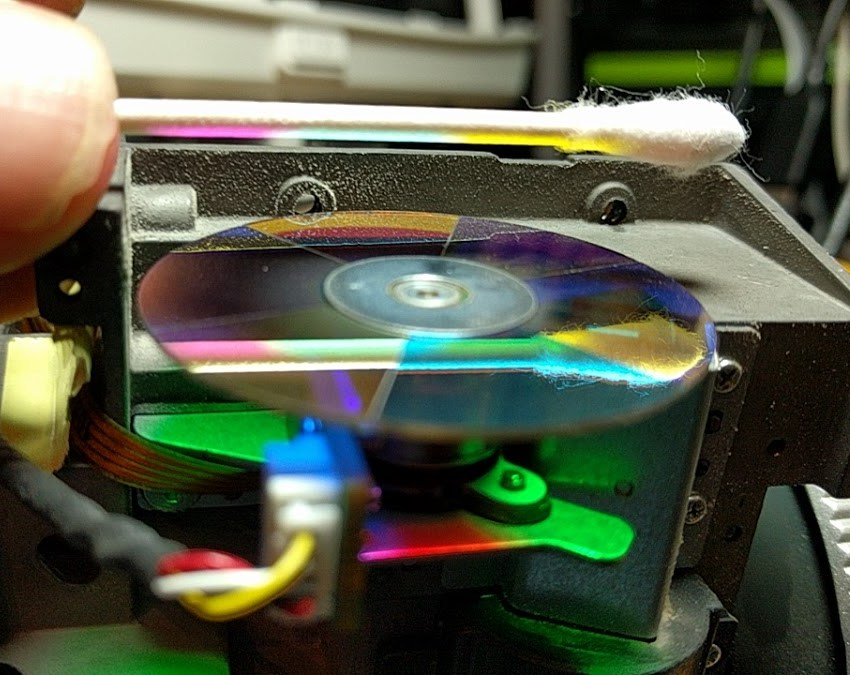
Six-segment dichroic color wheel from a DLP projector. Segments transmit red, green and blue, and therefore reflect cyan, magenta, and yellow.

Older DLP projectors typically transmit a white light source through a color wheel which uses dichroic filters to rapidly switch colors sent through the (monochrome) Digital micromirror device. Newer projectors may use laser or LED light sources to directly emit the desired light wavelengths.

They are used as laser harmonic separators. They separate the various harmonic components of frequency doubled laser systems by selective spectral reflection and transmission.

Dichroic filters are also used to create gobos for high-power lighting products. Pictures are made by overlapping up to four colored dichroic filters.

Photographic enlarger color heads use dichroic filters to adjust the color balance in the print.

Artistic glass jewelry is occasionally fabricated to behave as a dichroic filter. Because the wavelength of light selected by the filter varies with the angle of incidence of the light, such jewelry often has an iridescent effect, changing color as the (for example) earrings swing. Another interesting application of dichroic filters is spatial filtering.

With a technique licensed from Infitec, Dolby Labs uses dichroic filters for screening 3D movies. The left lens of the Dolby 3D glasses transmits specific narrow bands of red, green and blue frequencies, while the right lens transmits a different set of red, green and blue frequencies. The projector uses matching filters to display the images meant for the left and right eyes.

Long-pass dichroic filters applied to ordinary lighting can prevent it from attracting insects. In some cases, such filters can prevent attraction of other wildlife, reducing adverse environmental impact.

== Advantages ==
Dichroic filters have a much longer life than conventional filters; the color is intrinsic in the construction of the hard microscopic layers and cannot "bleach out" over the lifetime of the filter (unlike for example, gel filters). They can be fabricated to pass any passband frequency and block a selected amount of the stopband frequencies. Because light in the stopband is reflected rather than absorbed, there is much less heating of the dichroic filter than with conventional filters. Dichroics are capable of achieving extremely high laser damage thresholds, and are used for all the mirrors on the world's most powerful laser, the National Ignition Facility.

== See also ==
- Color gel
- Dielectric mirror
- Filter (optics)
- Holographic Versatile Disc
- Thin-film interference
- Thin-film optics

== Additional sources ==
- This article incorporates public domain material from Federal Standard 1037C. General Services Administration. Archived from the original on 2022-01-22.
- M. Bass, Handbook of Optics (2nd ed.) pp. 42.89-42.90 (1995)
