= Sony DCR-TRV900 =

Digital camera model

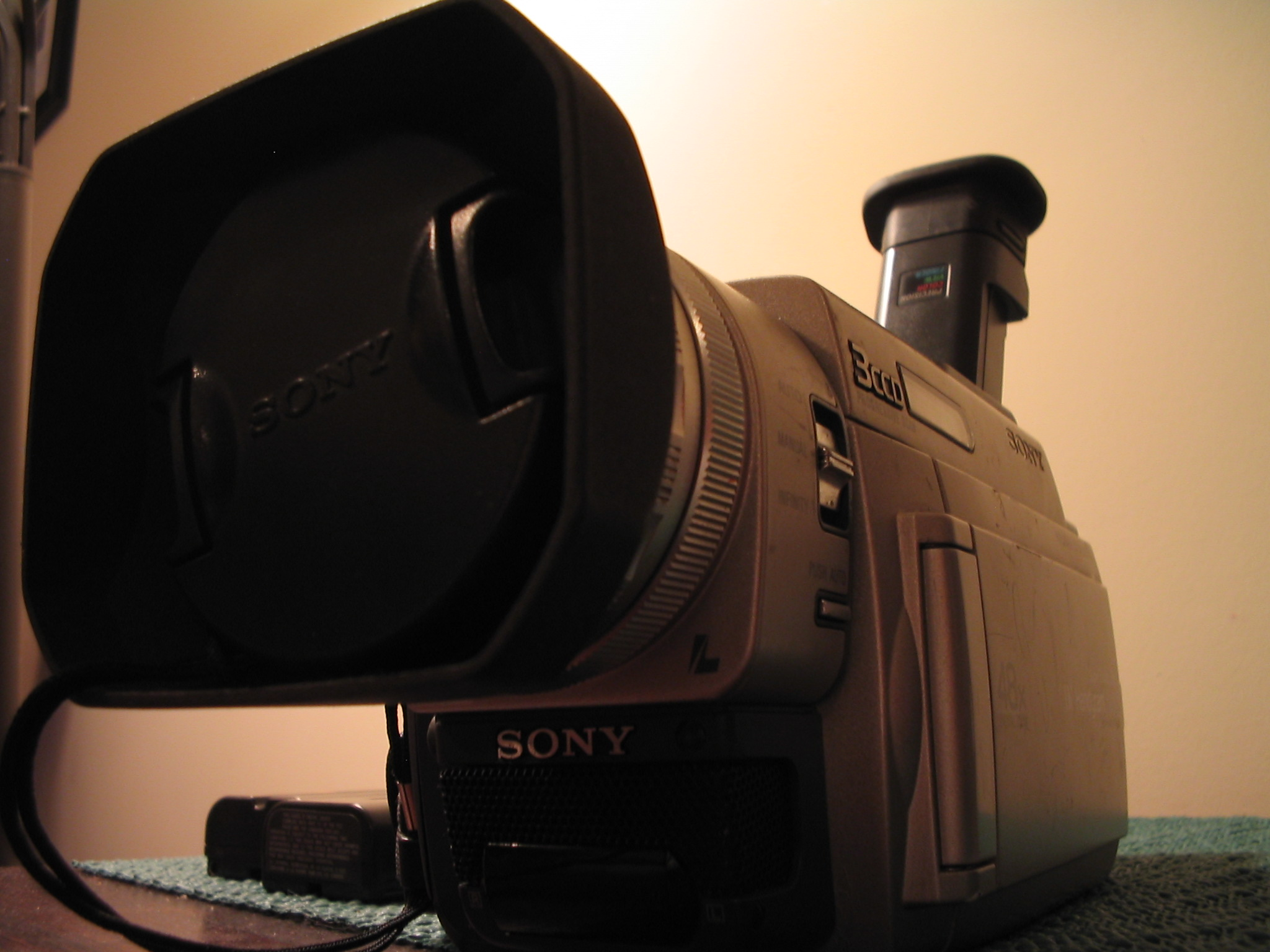
The Sony TRV900.

The Sony DCR-TRV900 was a standard definition 3CCD DV tape camcorder released by Sony in 1998, with an MSRP of US$2699. It was intended as a high-end consumer camera, more portable and less expensive than the top-of-the-line DCR-VX1000. In 2002, Sony replaced the TRV900 with the somewhat less well-received DCR-TRV950.

The camcorder had three 1/4-inch CCDs, which provided an exceptionally high-quality video image for a handheld camcorder of the period. It also had a 3.5-inch LCD screen, a color viewfinder, a 12× optical zoom, a 48× digital zoom, and a manual focus ring. The camcorder included a FireWire port for transferring video to a computer.

At the time, Sony had a pattern of releasing "professional" upgraded versions of their most popular consumer cameras, with the same chassis shape but made from more durable materials and in a darker color. Extra features included XLR inputs and the ability to record in the higher-grade DVCAM format. The TRV900's pro equivalent was the DSR-PD100, released in 2000; the TRV950's was the DSR-PDX10.

== Specs ==
| Recording Format | Recording System | CCD Size | Optical Zoom | Digital Zoom | LCD Panel | Lens Focal Length |
|---|---|---|---|---|---|---|
| MiniDV | NTSC | 1/4″ | 12× | 48× | 3.5' with color viewfinder | 4.3 - 51.6 mm |

| Filter Diameter | Image Stabilizer | Low Light Rating | Recommended Illumination | Audio Format |
|---|---|---|---|---|
| 52 mm | With Image Stabilizer | 4 Lux | 100 Lux | 12/16 Bit PCM Digital Stereo/Audio Dub |

| Max Shutter Speed | Dimensions | Pros | Cons |
|---|---|---|---|
| 1/10,000 of a second | 3.75' × 4.13' × 7.63' | 3 CCDS, Full Manual Controls, Adjustable mic levels | No XLR inputs, some controls behind LCD |

== TRV900 vs. TRV950 ==
An external mic can be added to take place of the audio produced with the on-board mic.

There are several differences between the two.

Chip Size

The TRV900 has 1/4' chips and the TRV950 has 1/4.7.

CCD Pixels

The TRV950 has substantially smaller CCD Pixels than the 900 with 380k pixels while the 950 has 690k.

LCD Monitor

Both have a 3.5" LCD Monitor.

Zoom

The only difference in zoom between the two is that the 900's digital zoom is 48× while the digital zoom for the TRV950 is 150×. Also the TRV950s zoom rocker is more sensitive.

Low Light

The TRV900 Low Light Rating is 4 lux while the TRV950 is 7 lux.

Progressive Mode

Although progressive mode on the TRV900 has a slow frame rate, the 950 has no explicit progressive mode. Running the "flash" digital effect at the lowest possible setting will simulate a progressive mode.

Audio

The TRV950 has a little more "hiss" than the TRV900. Also, the internal speaker of the TRV950 is smaller than the TRV900 and has less output.

A/D conversion and pass-through

The TRV950 has a fully functional analog to digital conversion and pass-through unlike the TRV900. The TRV900 will allow you to record from an analog source but will not directly convert the analog signal into DV when connected to a firewire port.
