= Thin-film optics =

Branch of optics

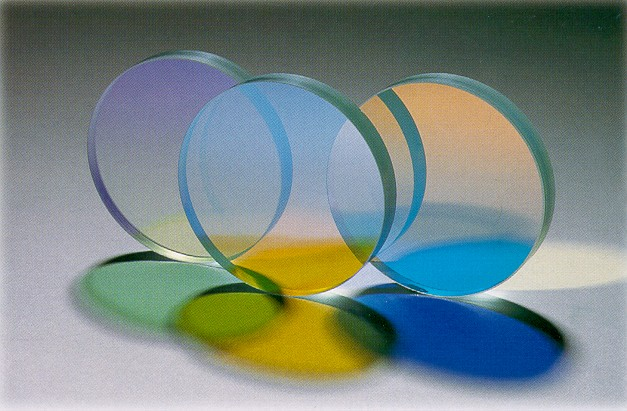
Dichroic filters are created using thin film optics.

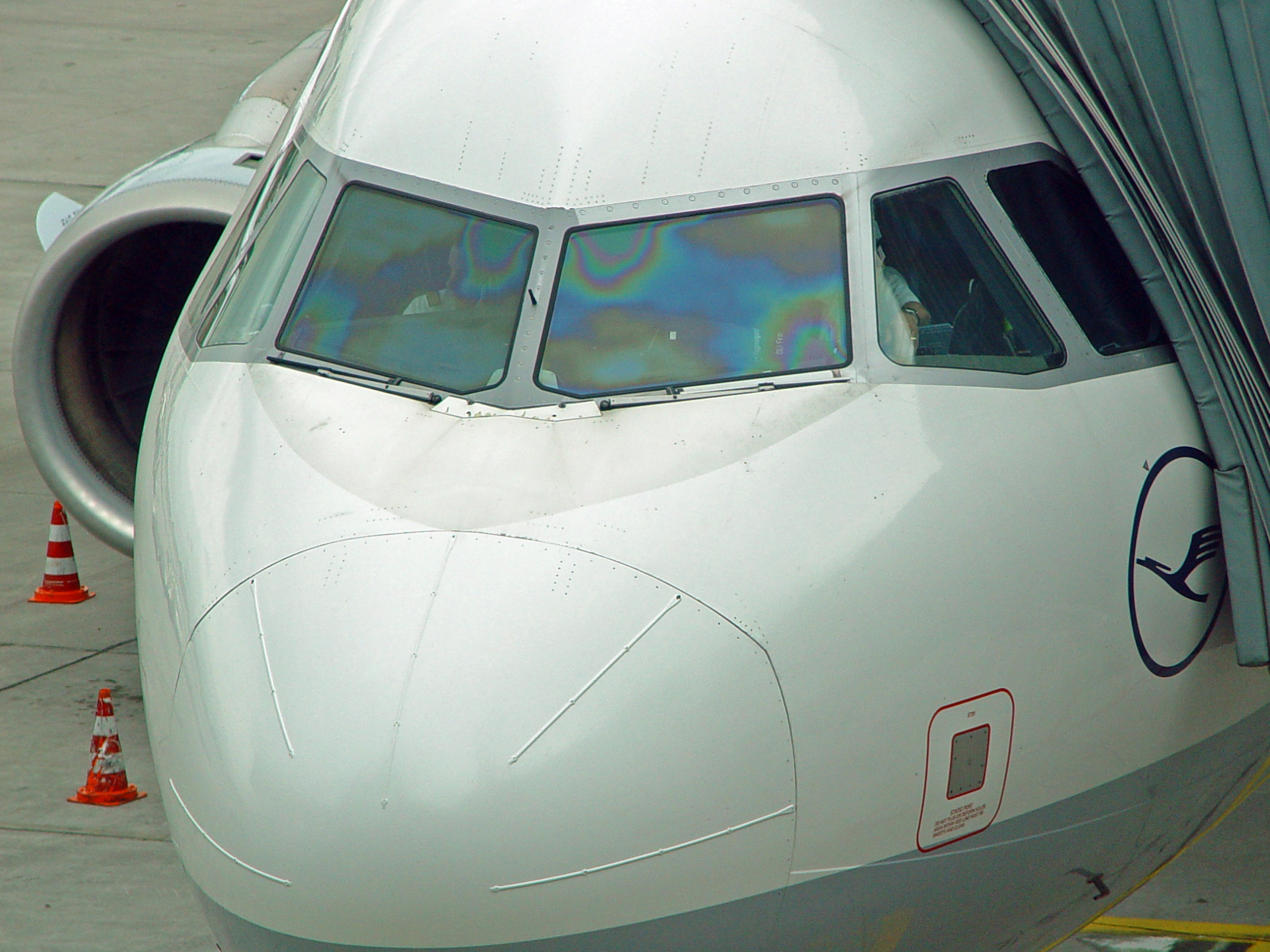
Thin film interference caused by ITO defrosting coating on an Airbus cockpit window. The film thickness is intentionally non-uniform to provide even heating at different distances from the electrodes.

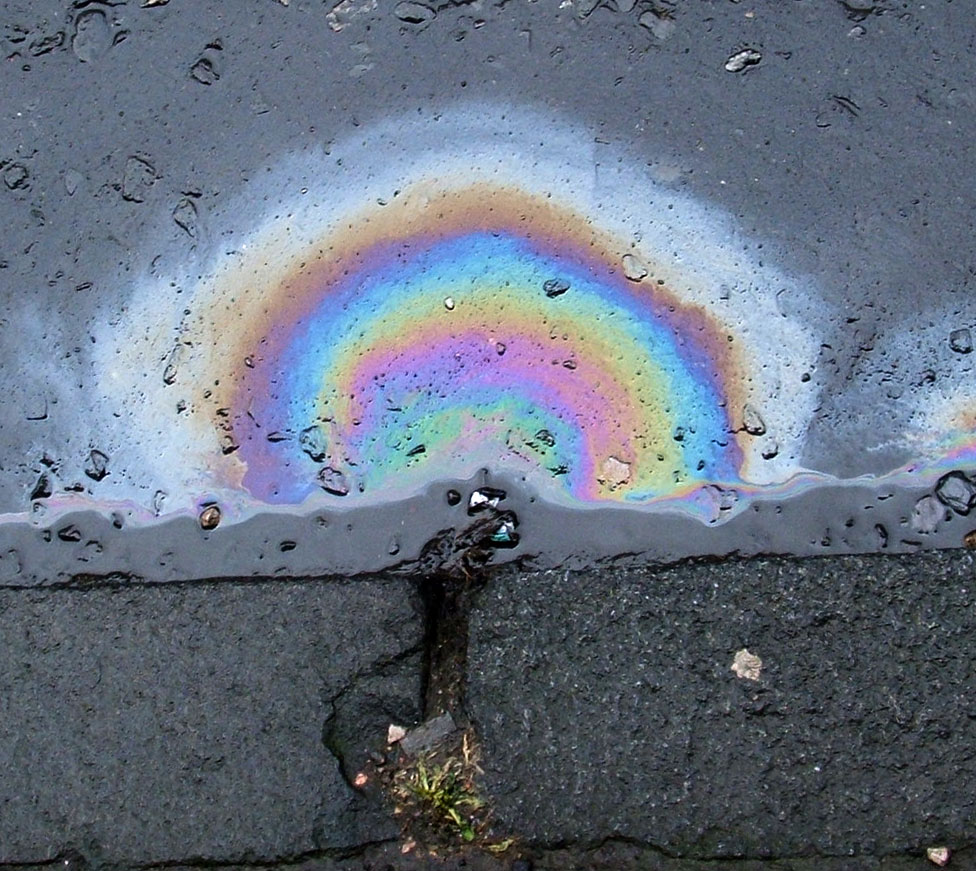
A pattern of coloured light formed by interference between white light being reflected from the surface of a thin film of diesel fuel on the surface of water, and the diesel-water interface.

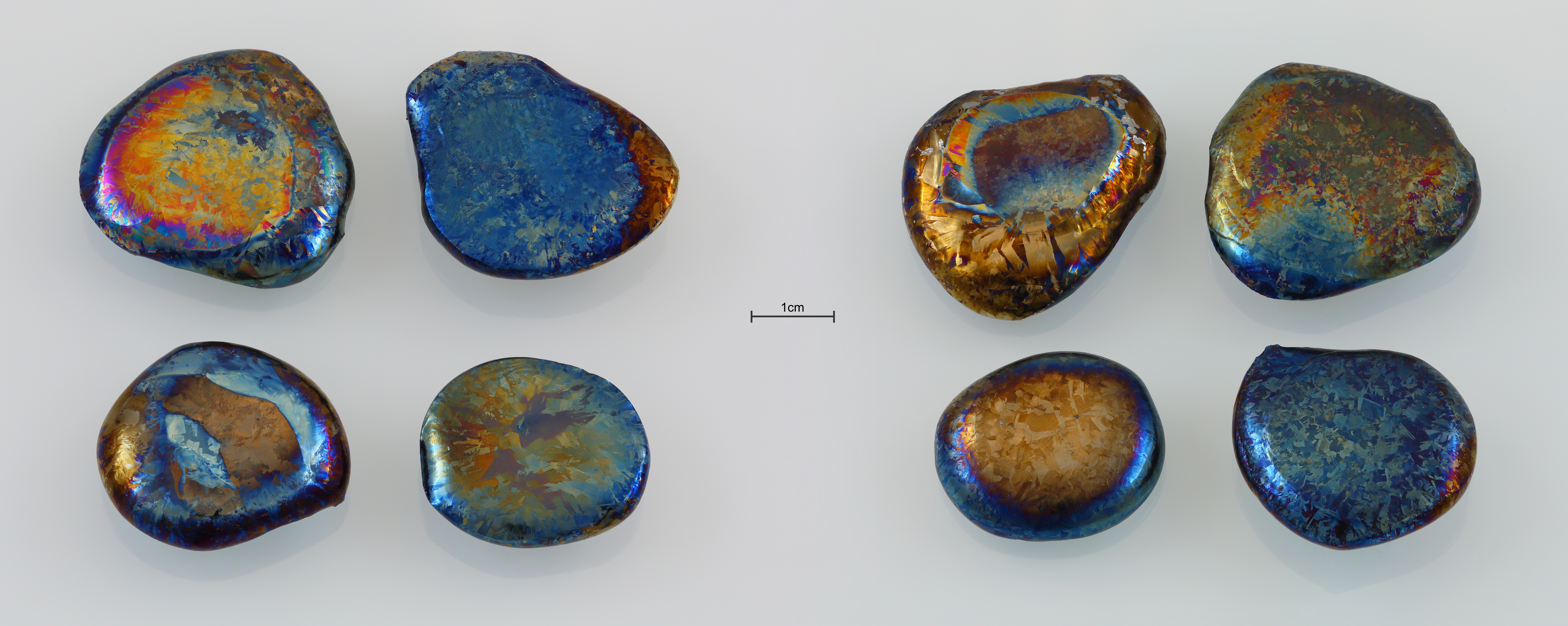
Hafnium oxidized ingots which exhibits thin film optical effects.

Thin-film optics is the branch of optics that deals with very thin structured layers of different materials. In order to exhibit thin-film optics, the thickness of the layers of material must be similar to the coherence length; for visible light it is most often observed between 200 and 1000 nm of thickness. Layers at this scale can have remarkable reflective properties due to light wave interference and the difference in refractive index between the layers, the air, and the substrate. These effects alter the way the optic reflects and transmits light. This effect, known as thin-film interference, is observable in soap bubbles and oil slicks.

More general periodic structures, not limited to planar layers, exhibit structural coloration with more complex dependence on angle, and are known as photonic crystals.

In manufacturing, thin film layers can be achieved through the deposition of one or more thin layers of material onto a substrate (usually glass). This is most often done using a physical vapor deposition process, such as evaporation deposition or sputter deposition, or a chemical process such as chemical vapor deposition.

Thin films are used to create optical coatings. Examples include low emissivity panes of glass for houses and cars, anti-reflective coatings on glasses, reflective baffles on car headlights, and for high precision optical filters and mirrors. Another application of these coatings is spatial filtering.

== Examples in the natural world ==
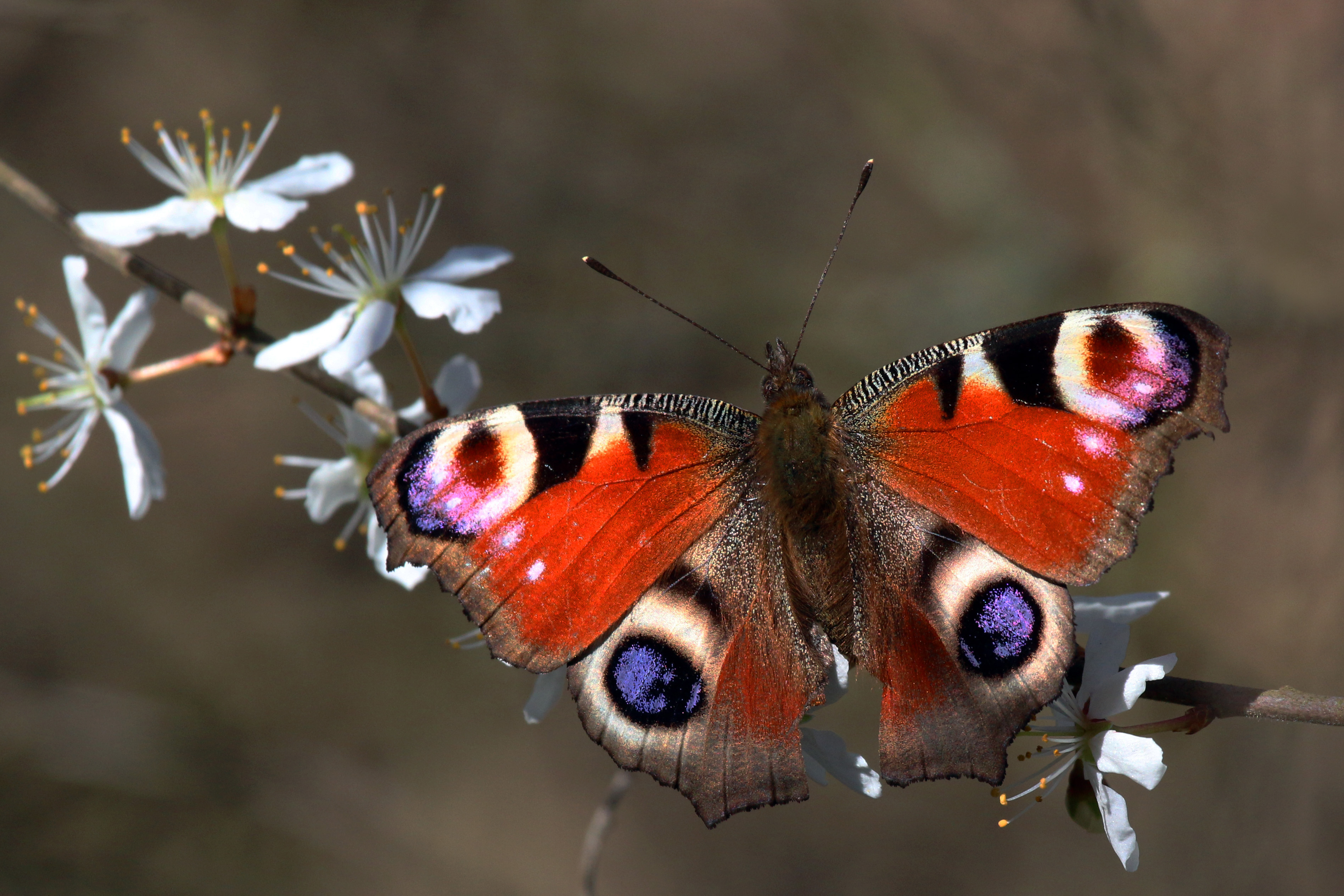
The blue wing patches of the Aglais io.

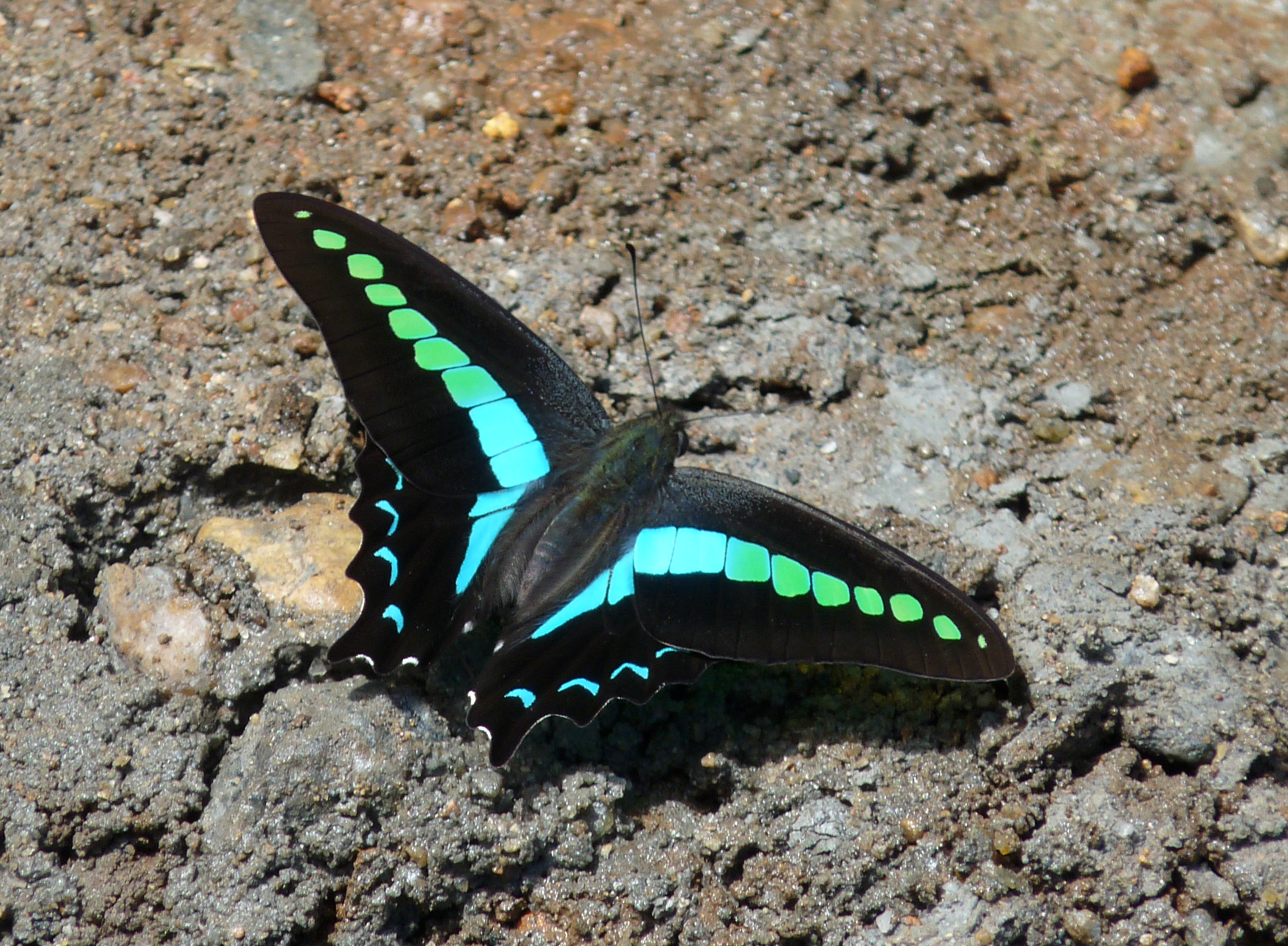
Graphium sarpedon.

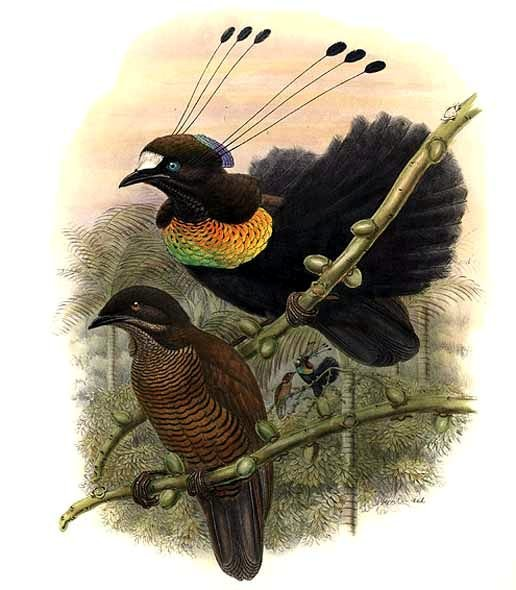
The breast feathers of the Lawes's parotia.

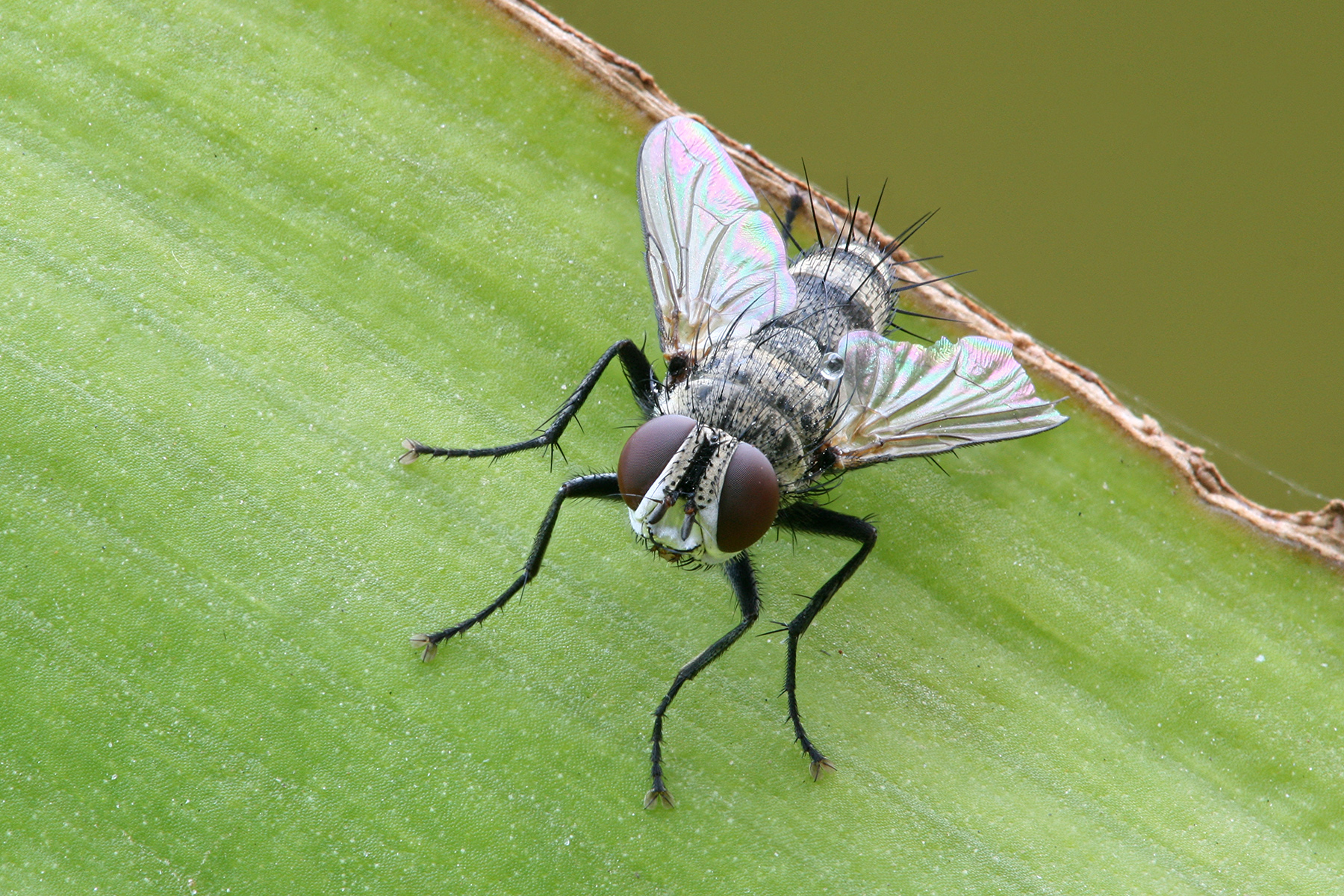
The thin-film interference that can be seen on many insect wings is due to thin-film optics.

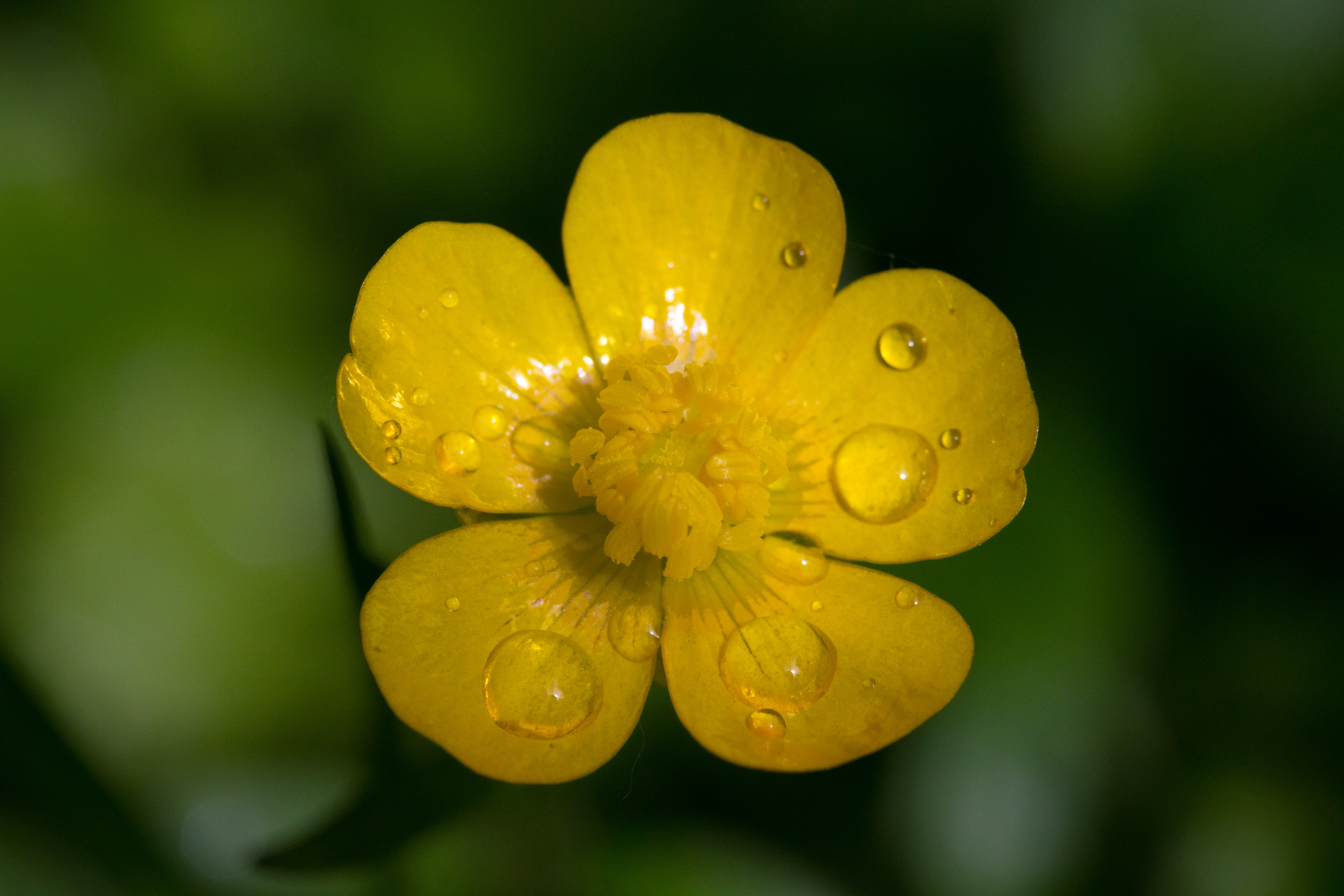
The glossy flowers of Ranunculus buttercups.

Thin-film layers are common in the natural world. Their effects produce colors seen in soap bubbles and oil slicks, as well as the structural coloration of some animals. The wings of many insects act as thin-films, because of their minimal thickness. This is clearly visible in the wings of many flies and wasps. In butterflies, the thin-film optics is visible when wing itself is not covered by wing scales, which is the case in the blue wing spots of the Aglais io and the blue-green patches of the Graphium sarpedon. In buttercups, the flower's gloss is due to a thin-film, which enhances the flower's visibility to pollinating insects and aids in temperature regulation of the plant's reproductive organs.

== See also ==
- Dichroic filter
- Dichroic prism
- Dielectric mirror
- Dual polarisation interferometry
- Fresnel equations
- Thin-film interference
- Transparent materials
