= Dielectric mirror =

Mirror made of dielectric materials

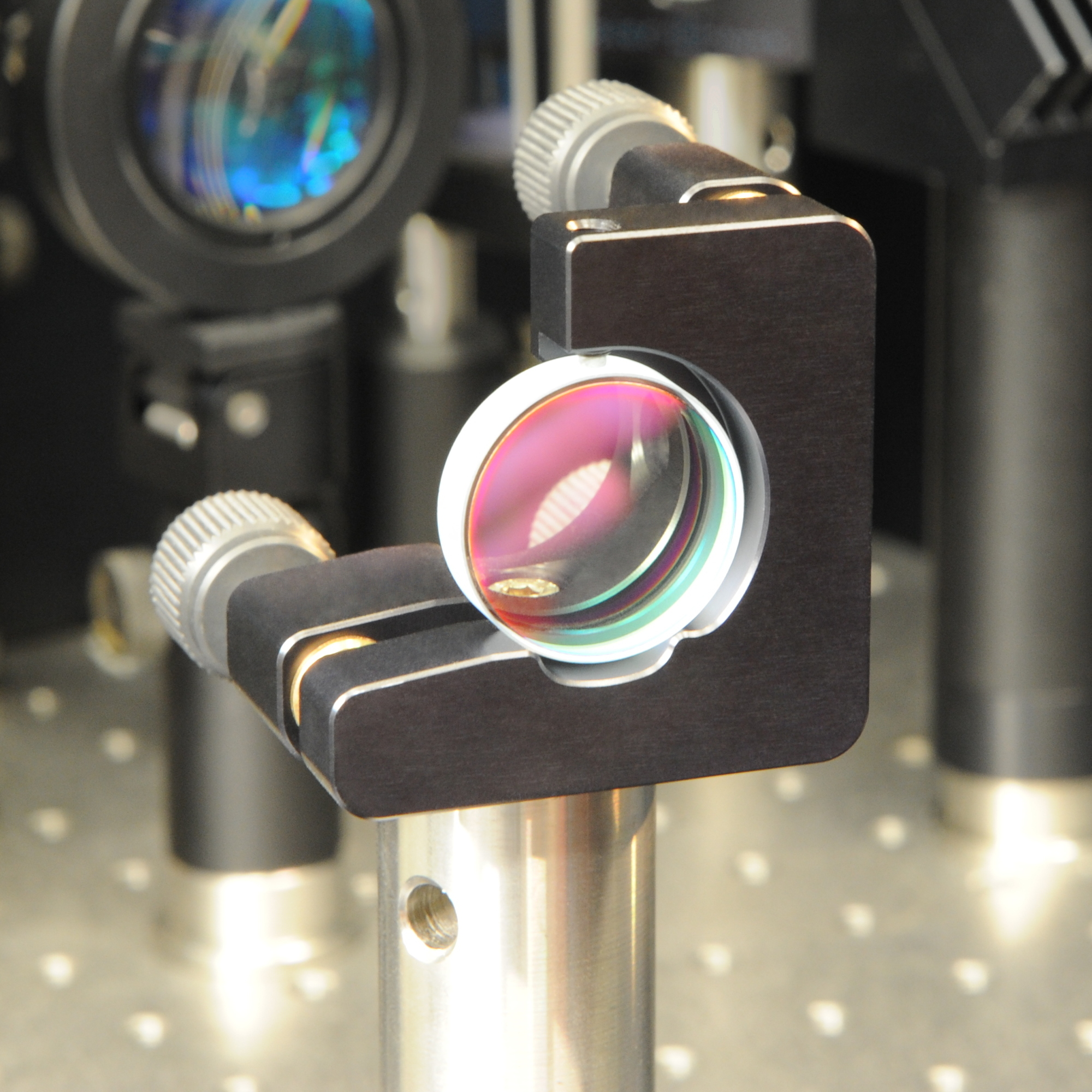
An infrared dielectric mirror in a mirror mount

A dielectric mirror, also known as a Bragg mirror, is a type of mirror composed of multiple thin layers of dielectric material, typically deposited on a substrate of glass or some other optical material. By careful choice of the type and thickness of the dielectric layers, one can design an optical coating with specified reflectivity at different wavelengths of light. Dielectric mirrors are also used to produce ultra-high-reflectivity mirrors: values of 99.999% or better over a narrow range of wavelengths can be produced using special techniques. Alternatively, they can be made to reflect a broad spectrum of light, such as the entire visible range or the spectrum of the Ti-sapphire laser.

Dielectric mirrors are very common in optics experiments, due to improved techniques that allow inexpensive manufacture of high-quality mirrors. Examples of their applications include laser cavity end mirrors, hot and cold mirrors, thin-film beamsplitters, high-damage-threshold mirrors, and the coatings on modern mirrorshades and some binoculars roof prism systems.

== Mechanism ==
Diagram of a dielectric mirror. Thin layers with a high refractive index n_{1} are interleaved with thicker layers with a lower refractive index n_{2}. The path lengths l_{A} and l_{B} differ by exactly one wavelength, which leads to constructive interference.

The reflectivity of a dielectric mirror is based on the interference of light reflected from the different layers of a dielectric stack. This is the same principle used in multi-layer anti-reflection coatings, which are dielectric stacks that have been designed to minimize rather than maximize reflectivity. Simple dielectric mirrors function like one-dimensional photonic crystals, consisting of a stack of layers with a high refractive index interleaved with layers of a low refractive index (see diagram). The thicknesses of the layers are chosen such that the path-length differences for reflections from different high-index layers are integer multiples of the wavelength for which the mirror is designed. The reflections from the low-index layers have exactly half a wavelength in path-length difference, but there is a 180° difference in phase shift at a low-to-high index boundary, compared to a high-to-low index boundary, which means that these reflections are also in phase. In the case of a mirror at normal incidence, the layers have a thickness of a quarter wavelength.

The color transmitted by the dielectric filters shifts when the angle of incident light changes.

Other designs have a more complicated structure generally produced by numerical optimization. In the latter case, the phase dispersion of the reflected light can also be controlled (a chirped mirror). In the design of dielectric mirrors, an optical transfer-matrix method can be used. A well-designed multilayer dielectric coating can provide a reflectivity of over 99% across the visible light spectrum.

Dielectric mirrors exhibit retardance as a function of angle of incidence and mirror design.

As shown in the GIF, the transmitted color shifts towards the blue with increasing angle of incidence. Regarding interference in the high-reflective-index $n_1$ medium, this blueshift is given by the formula

$$2n_2d_2\cos\left(\theta_2\right)=m\lambda$$,

where $m\lambda$ is any multiple of the transmitted wavelength and $\theta_2$ is the angle of incidence in the second medium. See thin-film interference for a derivation. However, there is also interference in the low-refractive-index medium. The best reflectivity will be at

$$\lambda_\perp/\lambda_\theta=\frac{cos(\theta_2)+cos(\theta_1)}{2}\approx \sqrt{1-\frac{sin^2(\theta)}{n^2}}$$,

where $\lambda_\perp$ is the transmitted wavelength under perpendicular angle of incidence and

$$n=\sqrt{\frac{2}{n_1^{-2}+n_2^{-2}}}$$.

== Manufacturing ==
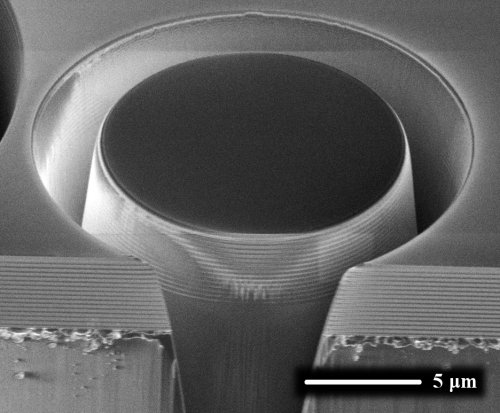
An electron microscope image of an approximately 13 micrometre piece of dielectric mirror being cut from a larger substrate. Alternating layers of Ta_{2}O_{5} and SiO_{2} are visible on the bottom edge.

The manufacturing techniques for dielectric mirrors are based on thin-film deposition methods. Common techniques are physical vapor deposition (which includes evaporative deposition and ion beam assisted deposition), chemical vapor deposition, ion beam deposition, molecular-beam epitaxy, sputter deposition, and sol-gel deposition. Common materials are magnesium fluoride (n = 1.37), silicon dioxide (n = 1.45), tantalum pentoxide (n = 2.28) , zinc sulfide (n = 2.32), and titanium dioxide (n = 2.4).

Polymeric dielectric mirrors are fabricated industrially via co-extrusion of melt polymers, and by spin-coating or dip-coating on smaller scale.

== See also ==
- Distributed Bragg reflector – Structure used in waveguides
- Dichroic filter – Wavelength-selective optical filter
- Perfect mirror – Mirror that solely reflects light without absorption or transmission
- Rugate filter – Dielectric mirror that selectively reflects a particular wavelength range of light
