= Ion-beam–assisted deposition =

Materials engineering technique

Ion beam assisted deposition (IBAD or IAD) is a materials engineering technique which combines ion implantation with simultaneous sputtering or another physical vapor deposition technique. Besides providing independent control of parameters such as ion energy, temperature and arrival rate of atomic species during deposition, this technique is especially useful to create a gradual transition between the substrate material and the deposited film, and for depositing films with less built-in strain than is possible by other techniques. These two properties can result in films with a much more durable bond to the substrate. Experience has shown that some meta-stable compounds like cubic boron nitride (c-BN), can only be formed in thin films when bombarded with energetic ions during the deposition process.

== See also ==
- Ion beam deposition
- Physical vapor deposition
- Ion plating
