= Waterproof jewelry =

Marketing term for jewelry sold as suitable for wear in water

Waterproof jewelry, also known as water-resistant or tarnish-proof jewelry, is a term for jewelry that is advertised as water resistant and suitable for activities such as showering, swimming and exercising. The term usually refers to stainless steel jewelry with a metal coating applied by physical vapor deposition (PVD). There is no fixed definition, and jewelers do not agree on which materials it should cover.

== History ==
Stainless Steel was long used mainly for men's jewelry In 2015, retailers told the Australian trade magazine Jeweller that colored ion plating was behind the material's recent rise in popularity amongst women. Pastiche's director, Amy Bradley was interviewed in 2016 and had sold men's steel jewelry for more than 16 years, but had only added a women's selection in 2008. By 2018, Jeweller had reported that stainless steel had become popular enough with both men and women to established itself as its own category.

In the 2020s, stainless steel jewelry with PVD finishes became widely sold by direct-to-consumer brands as jewelry that could be worn in water. These became the subject of consumer shopping guides from outlets including CNN Underscore, Marie Claire and the Spanish magazine ¡Hola!.

In 2026, established jewelry companies began launching their own stainless steel lines. Hot Diamonds, a British sterling silver brand, announced in February that it would launch a separate line of PVD-plated 316L stainless steel jewelry, marketed as waterproof, sweat-resistant and hypoallergenic. Their head of commerce said rising silver prices had led the company to bring the launch forward. In June, the direct-to-consumer brand Mejuri, known mainly for gold and silver jewelry, released its first steel collection. Its co-founder told JCK that the company chose steel for design reasons, not because of precious-metal prices, and called the metal durable, waterproof and hypoallergenic.

== Construction ==
Most pieces sold under the term are surgical-grade stainless steel with a PVD gold finish. Jewelers interviewed by the British trade publication Professional Jeweller said that jewelry advertised as waterproof and non-tarnishing often uses PVD coatings. Catarina Oliveira, founder of the brand Hey Harper, told CNN Underscored that its jewelry was made of stainless steel with a coating she described as stronger than conventional gold plating.

== Terminology and testing ==
The wording varies from source to source. One trade publication called a 2026 steel collection waterproof, while another described the same collection as water-resistant. Experts quoted by Marie Claire in 2024 disagreed over the term itself. One said that only solid gold jewelry is truly waterproof; the founder of a stainless steel jewelry company said PVD coating makes steel jewelry waterproof.

In the United Kingdom, The Birmingham Assay Office offers a waterproof test for jewelry that simulates exposure to water, sweat, chlorine and saltwater. Brands are able to use the test results to support their waterproof claims. The office's laboratory (which is accredited to ISO/IEC 17025) says it created its own tests for two of the most common claims made about jewelry: that it is hypoallergenic and that it is waterproof.

== Regulation ==
In the United States, the Federal Trade Commission's Guides for the Jewelry, Precious Metals, and Pewter Industries address related claims. A jewelry product should not be called "corrosion resistant" or "rust resistant" unless every part of it will hold up against corrosion and rust for most of its expected life under normal use. The Guides name austenitic stainless steels among the metals that can meet this standard.

== See also ==
- Costume jewelry
- Physical vapor deposition
- Stainless steel
- Water Resistant mark
