= Hannspeter Winter =

Hannspeter Winter (born in Wels on 22 August 1941; died in Vienna on 8 November 2006) was an Austrian plasma physicist who did research on hollow atoms and held a full professorship at the TU Wien. He won the Austrian Cross of Honour for Science and Art, 1st class in 2001 and the prestigious German Alexander von Humboldt Research Prize in 2003. He was co-editor of Europhysics Letters, Heavy Ion Physics, Plasma Physics and Controlled Fusion and has published approximately 270 peer-reviewed papers in international scientific journals. He was married to the Austrian judge Renate Winter.
