= Calo tester =

Device used to measure the thickness of coatings

The Calo tester, also known as a ball crater or coating thickness tester, is a simple and inexpensive piece of equipment used to measure the thickness of coatings. Coatings with thicknesses typically between 0.1 and 50 micrometres, such as physical vapor deposition (PVD) coatings or chemical vapor deposition (CVD) coatings, are used in many industries to improve the surface properties of tools and components. The Calo tester is also used to measure the amount of coating wear after a wear test carried out using a pin-on-disc tester.

The Calo tester consists of a holder for the surface to be tested and a steel sphere of known diameter that is rotated against the surface by a rotating shaft connected to a motor whilst diamond paste is applied to the contact area. The sphere is rotated for a short period of time (less than 20 seconds for a 0.1 to 5 micrometre thickness) but due to the abrasive nature of the diamond paste this is sufficient time to wear a crater through thin coatings.

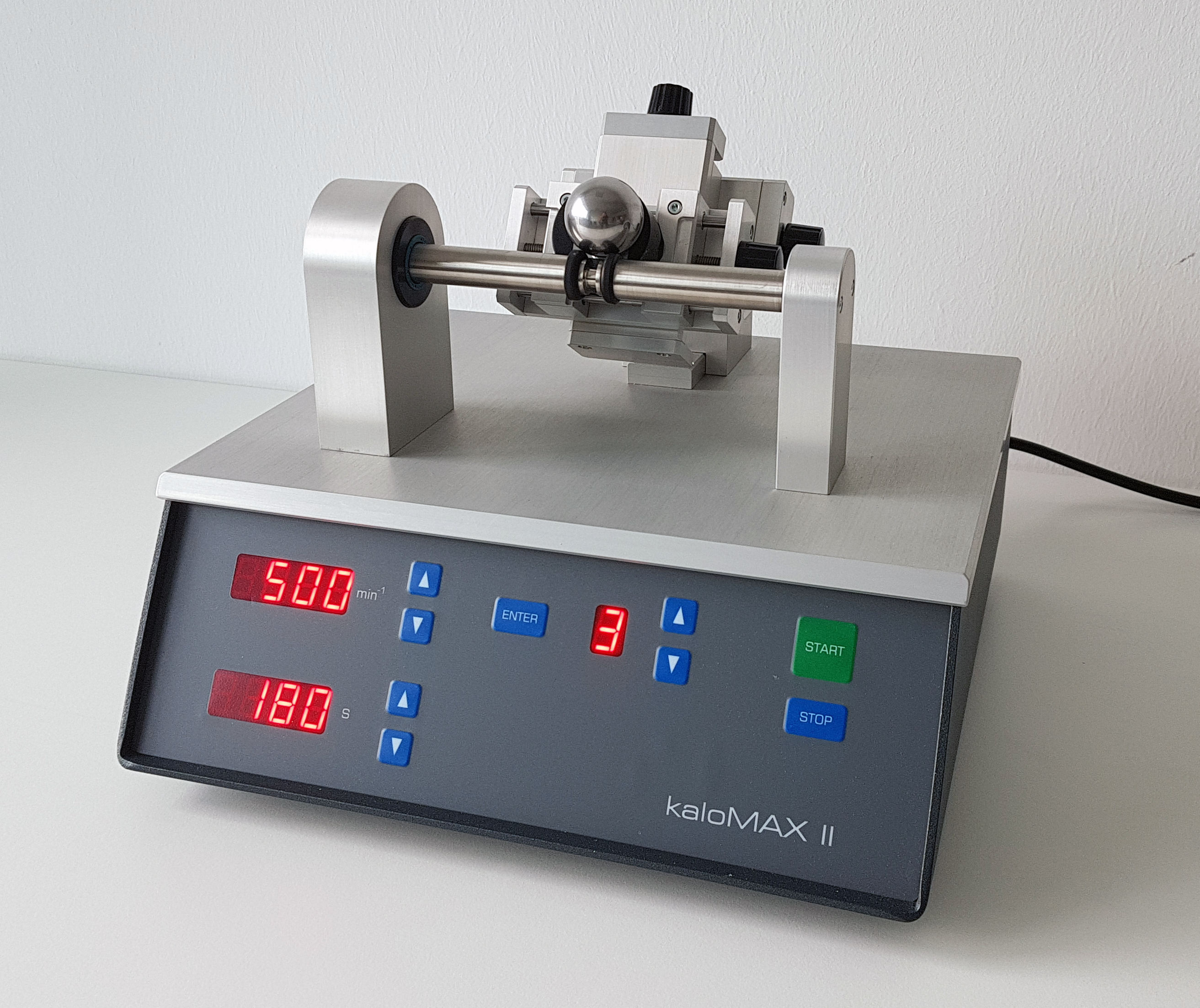
Calo tester

== Calculating coating thickness using the Calo tester ==
An optical microscope is used to take two measurements across the crater after the Calo test and the coating thickness is calculated using a simple geometrical equation.

$t = \frac{x y}d$

Where t = coating thickness, d = diameter of the sphere x = difference between the radius of the crater and radius of the part of the crater at the bottom of the coating x+y = diameter of the crater
