= Cold mirror =

Highly visible-reflective surface that also transmits in infrared

A cold mirror is a specialized dielectric mirror, a dichroic filter, that reflects the entire visible light spectrum while very efficiently transmitting infrared wavelengths. Similar to hot mirrors, cold mirrors can be designed for an incidence angle ranging between zero and 45 degrees, and are constructed with multi-layer dielectric coatings, in a manner similar to interference filters. While the filters used with infrared photography absorb visible (and shorter) wavelengths, cold mirrors are designed to reflect visible wavelengths. Cold mirrors can be employed as dichroic beamsplitters with laser systems to reflect visible light wavelengths while transmitting infrared.

== See also ==
- Mirror
- Hot mirror
