= Hot mirror =

Special reflective surface meant to aid in infrared light direction

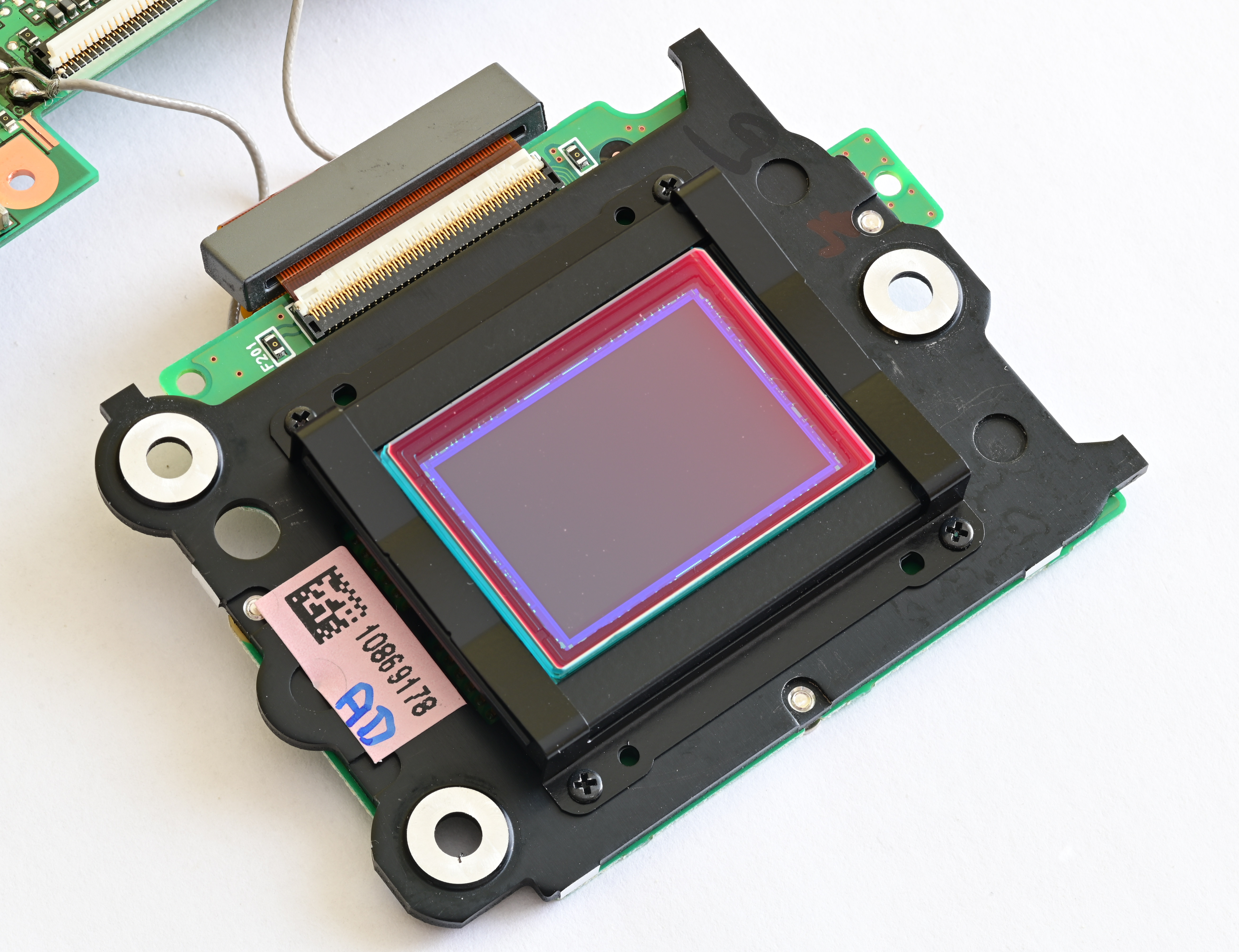
Hot mirror in front of the image sensor of a DSLR. Note reddish reflection of ambient light, and teal edge of filter.

A hot mirror is a specialized dielectric mirror, a dichroic filter, often employed to protect optical systems by reflecting infrared light back into a light source, while allowing visible light to pass. Hot mirrors can be designed to be inserted into the optical system at an incidence angle varying between zero and 45 degrees, and are useful in a variety of applications where the buildup of waste heat can damage components or adversely affect spectral characteristics of the illumination source. Wavelengths reflected by an infrared hot mirror range from about 750 to 1250 nanometers. By transmitting visible light wavelengths while reflecting infrared, hot mirrors can also serve as dichromatic beam splitters for specialized applications in fluorescence microscopy or optical eye tracking.

Some early digital cameras designed for visible light capture, such as the Associated Press NC2000 and Nikon Coolpix 950, were unusually sensitive to infrared radiation, and tended to produce colors that were contaminated with infrared. This was particularly problematic with scenes that contained strong sources of infrared, such as fires, although the effect could be moderated by inserting a photographic hot mirror filter into the imaging pathway. Conversely, these cameras could be used for infrared photography by inserting a cold mirror filter, more commonly known as an infrared filter, into the imaging pathway, most commonly by mounting the filter on the front of the lens.

New incandescent bulbs incorporate hot mirrors, increasing efficiency by redirecting unwanted infrared frequencies back to the filament.
