= Evaporation (deposition) =

Common method of thin-film deposition

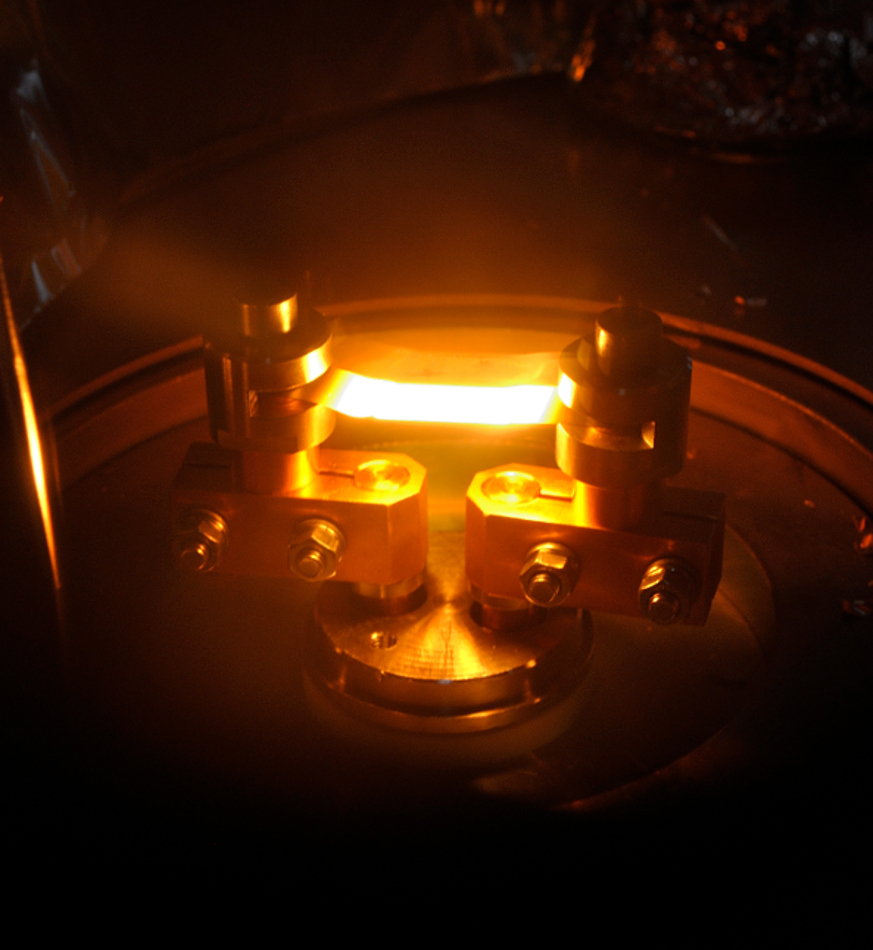
Thermal evaporation in a resistive heated boat

Evaporation is a common method of thin-film deposition. The source material is evaporated in a vacuum. The vacuum allows vapor particles to travel directly to the target object (substrate), where they condense back to a solid state. Evaporation is used in microfabrication, and to make macro-scale products such as metallized plastic film.

== History ==
Evaporation deposition was first observed in incandescent light bulbs during the late nineteenth century. The problem of bulb blackening was one of the main obstacles to making bulbs with long life, and received a great amount of study by Thomas Edison and his General Electric company, as well as many others working on their own lightbulbs. The phenomenon was first adapted to a process of vacuum deposition by Pohl and Pringsheim in 1912. However, it found little use until the 1930s, when people began experimenting with ways to make aluminum-coated mirrors for use in telescopes. Aluminum was far too reactive to be used in chemical wet deposition or electroplating methods. John D. Strong was successful in making the first aluminum telescope-mirrors in the 1930s using evaporation deposition. Because it produces an amorphous (glassy) coating rather than a crystalline one, with high uniformity and precise control of thickness, thereafter it became a common process for producing thin-film optical coatings from a variety of materials, both metal and non-metal (dielectric), and has been adopted for many other uses, such as coating plastic toys and automobile parts, the production of semiconductors and microchips, and Mylar films with uses ranging from capacitors to spacecraft thermal control.

== Physical principle ==
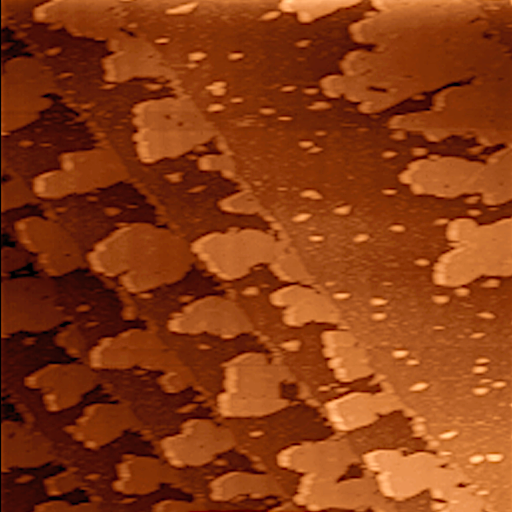
One-atom-thick islands of silver deposited on the (111) surface of palladium by thermal evaporation. The substrate, even though it received a mirror polish and vacuum annealing, appears as a series of terraces. Calibration of the coverage was achieved by tracking the time needed to complete a full monolayer using tunneling microscopy (STM) and from the emergence of quantum-well states characteristic of the silver film thickness in photoemission spectroscopy (ARPES). Image size is 250 nm by 250 nm.

Evaporation involves two basic processes: a hot source evaporates a material and it condenses on a colder substrate that is below its melting point. It resembles the familiar process by which liquid water appears on the lid of a boiling pot. However, the gaseous environment and heat source (see "Equipment" below) are different. Liquids such as water cannot exist in a vacuum, because they require some level of external pressure to hold the atoms and molecules together. In a vacuum, materials sublimate (vaporize), expand outward, and upon contact with a surface condense back into a solid (deposit) without ever passing through a liquid state. Thus, in comparison to water, the process is more like frost forming on a window.

Evaporation takes place in a vacuum, i.e. vapors other than the source material are almost entirely removed before the process begins. In high vacuum (with a long mean free path), evaporated particles can travel directly to the deposition target without colliding with the background gas. (By contrast, in the boiling pot example, the water vapor pushes the air out of the pot before it can reach the lid.) At a typical pressure of 10^{−4} Pa, a 0.4-nm particle has a mean free path of 60 m. Hot objects in the evaporation chamber, such as heating filaments, produce unwanted vapors that limit the quality of the vacuum.

Evaporated atoms that collide with foreign particles may react with them; for instance, if aluminium is deposited in the presence of oxygen, it will form aluminium oxide. They also reduce the amount of vapor that reaches the substrate, which makes the thickness difficult to control.

Evaporated materials deposit nonuniformly if the substrate has a rough surface (as integrated circuits often do). Because the evaporated material attacks the substrate mostly from a single direction, protruding features block the evaporated material from some areas. This phenomenon is called "shadowing" or "step coverage."

When evaporation is performed in poor vacuum or close to atmospheric pressure, the resulting deposition is generally non-uniform and tends not to be a continuous or smooth film. Rather, the deposition will appear fuzzy.

== Equipment ==
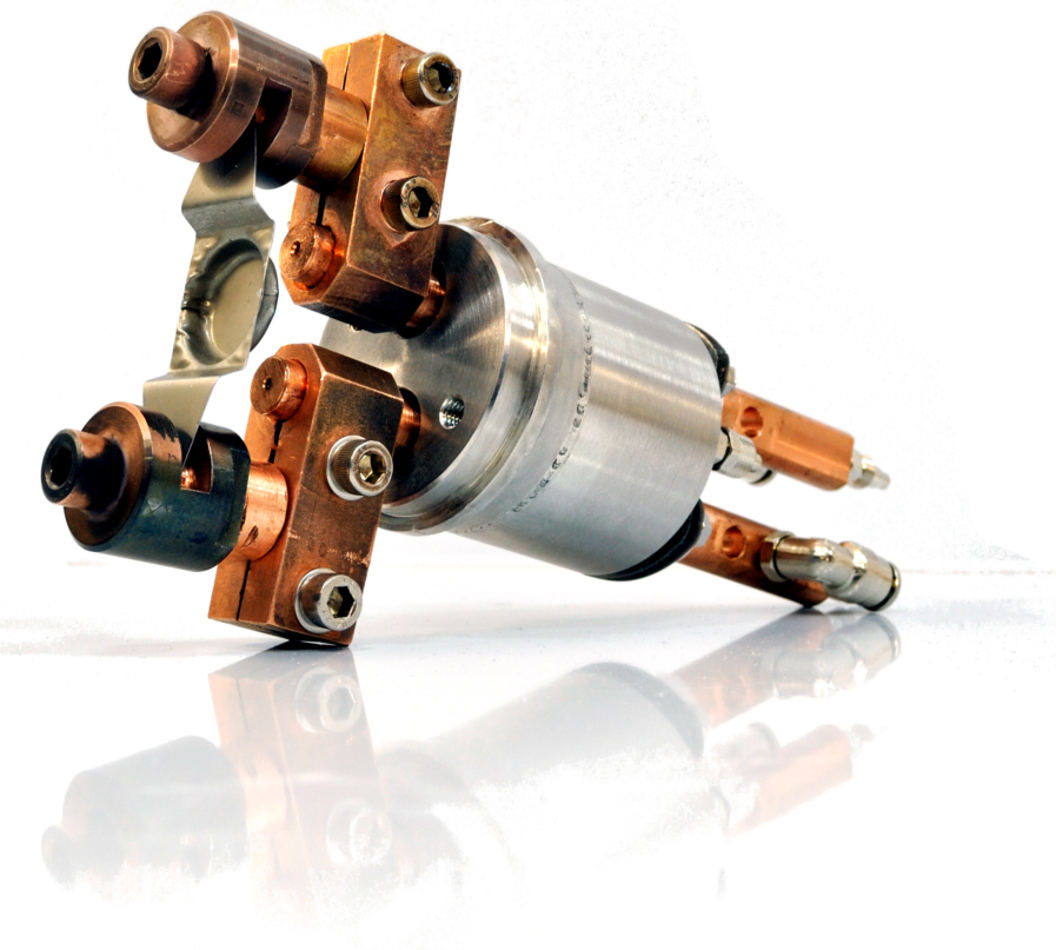
A thermal evaporator with a molybdenum boat fixed between two massive copper feedthroughs cooled by water.

Any evaporation system includes a vacuum pump. It also includes an energy source that evaporates the material to be deposited. Many different energy sources exist:

- In the thermal method, metal material (in the form of wire, pellets, shot) is fed onto heated semimetal (ceramic) evaporators known as "boats" due to their shape. A pool of melted metal forms in the boat cavity and evaporates into a cloud above the source. Alternatively the source material is placed in a crucible, which is radiatively heated by an electric filament, or the source material may be hung from the filament itself (filament evaporation).
  - Molecular beam epitaxy is an advanced form of thermal evaporation.
- In the electron-beam method, the source is heated by an electron beam with an energy up to 15 keV.
- In flash evaporation, a fine wire or powder of source material is fed continuously onto a hot ceramic or metallic bar, and evaporates on contact.
- Resistive evaporation is accomplished by passing a large current through a resistive wire or foil containing the material to be deposited. The heating element is often referred to as an "evaporation source". Wire type evaporation sources are made from tungsten wire and can be formed into filaments, baskets, heaters or looped shaped point sources. Boat type evaporation sources are made from tungsten, tantalum, molybdenum or ceramic type materials capable of withstanding high temperatures.
- Induction heating evaporation involves the heating of a source material using an induction heater.

Some systems mount the substrate on an out-of-plane planetary mechanism. The mechanism rotates the substrate simultaneously around two axes, to reduce shadowing.

== Optimization ==
- Purity of the deposited film depends on the quality of the vacuum, and on the purity of the source material.
- At a given vacuum pressure the film purity will be higher at higher deposition rates as this minimises the relative rate of gaseous impurity inclusion.
- The thickness of the film will vary due to the geometry of the evaporation chamber. Collisions with residual gases aggravate nonuniformity of thickness.
- Wire filaments for evaporation cannot deposit thick films, because the size of the filament limits the amount of material that can be deposited. Evaporation boats and crucibles offer higher volumes for thicker coatings. Thermal evaporation offers faster evaporation rates than sputtering. Flash evaporation and other methods that use crucibles can deposit thick films.
- In order to deposit a material, the evaporation system must be able to vaporize it. This makes refractory materials such as tungsten hard to deposit by methods that do not use electron-beam heating.
- Electron-beam evaporation allows tight control of the evaporation rate. Thus, an electron-beam system with multiple beams and multiple sources can deposit a chemical compound or composite material of known composition.
- Step coverage

== Applications ==
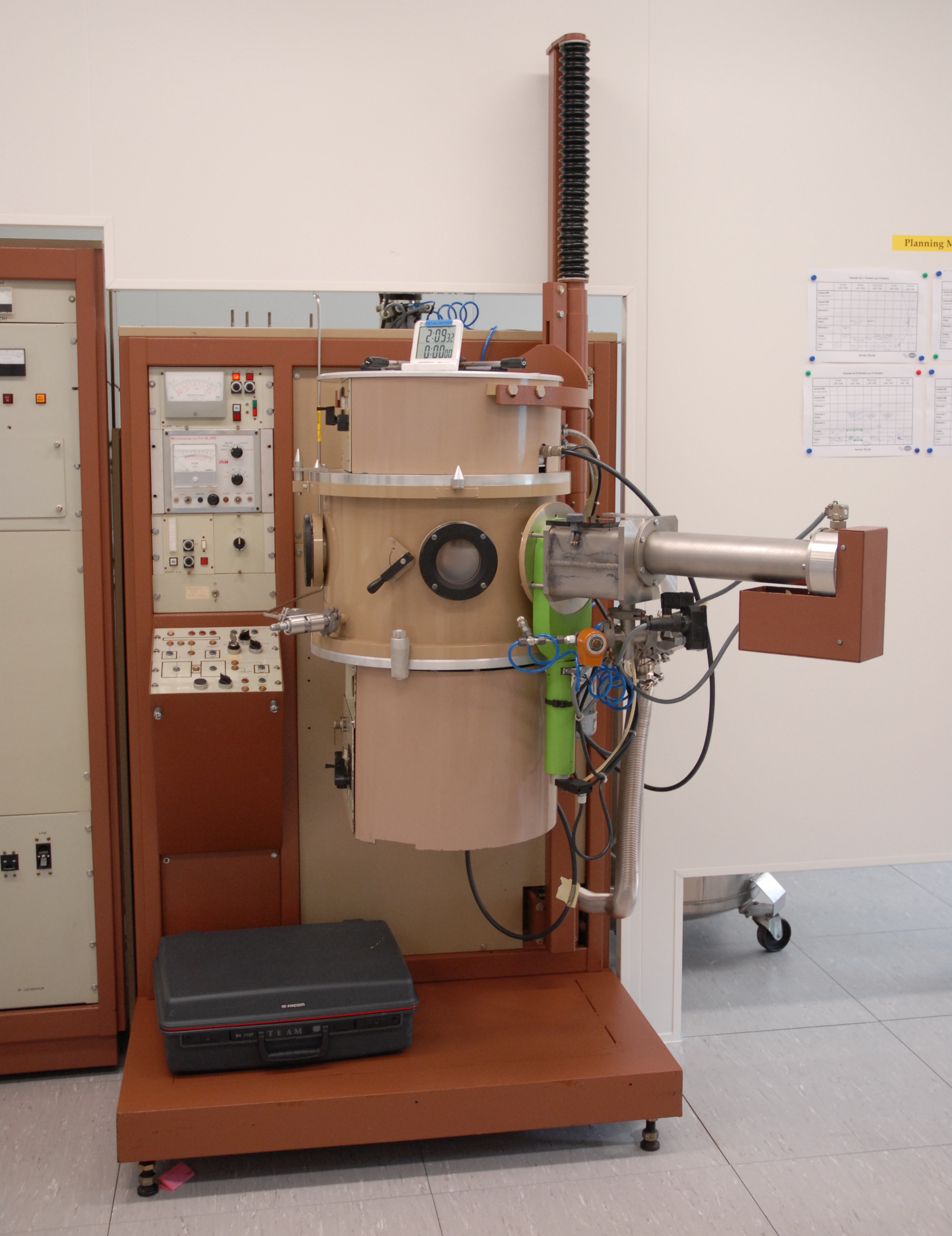
Evaporation machine used for metallization at LAAS technological facility in Toulouse, France.

An important example of an evaporative process is the production of aluminized PET film packaging film in a roll-to-roll web system. Often, the aluminum layer in this material is not thick enough to be entirely opaque since a thinner layer can be deposited more cheaply than a thick one. The main purpose of the aluminum is to isolate the product from the external environment by creating a barrier to the passage of light, oxygen, or water vapor.

Evaporation is commonly used in microfabrication to deposit metal films.

== Comparison to other deposition methods ==
- Alternatives to evaporation, such as sputtering and chemical vapor deposition, have better step coverage. This may be an advantage or disadvantage, depending on the desired result.
- Sputtering tends to deposit material more slowly than evaporation.
- Sputtering uses a plasma, which produces many high-speed atoms that bombard the substrate and may damage it. Evaporated atoms have a Maxwellian energy distribution, determined by the temperature of the source, which reduces the number of high-speed atoms. However, electron beams tend to produce X-rays (Bremsstrahlung) and stray electrons, each of which can also damage the substrate.
