= Hollow atom =

Type of atom

Formation and decay of a hollow atom during the interaction of a slow highly charged ion with a solid surface.

Hollow atoms (discovered in 1990 by a French team of researchers around Jean-Pierre Briand) are short-lived multiply excited neutral atoms which carry a large part of their Z electrons (Z ... projectile nuclear charge) in high-n levels while inner shells remain (transiently) empty. The hollow atoms are exotic atomic species whose all, or most, electrons lie in excited states, while the innermost shells are empty. These atomic species were first observed during the interaction of highly charged ions with surfaces. population inversion arises for typically 100 femtoseconds during the interaction of a slow highly charged ion (HCI) with a solid surface.
Despite this limited lifetime, the formation and decay of a hollow atom can be conveniently studied from ejected electrons and soft X-rays, and the trajectories, energy loss and final charge state distribution of surface-scattered projectiles. For impact on insulator surfaces the potential energy contained by hollow atom may also cause the release of target atoms and -ions via potential sputtering and the formation of nanostructures on a surface.
