= Ion plating =

Method of coating solid surfaces with ions

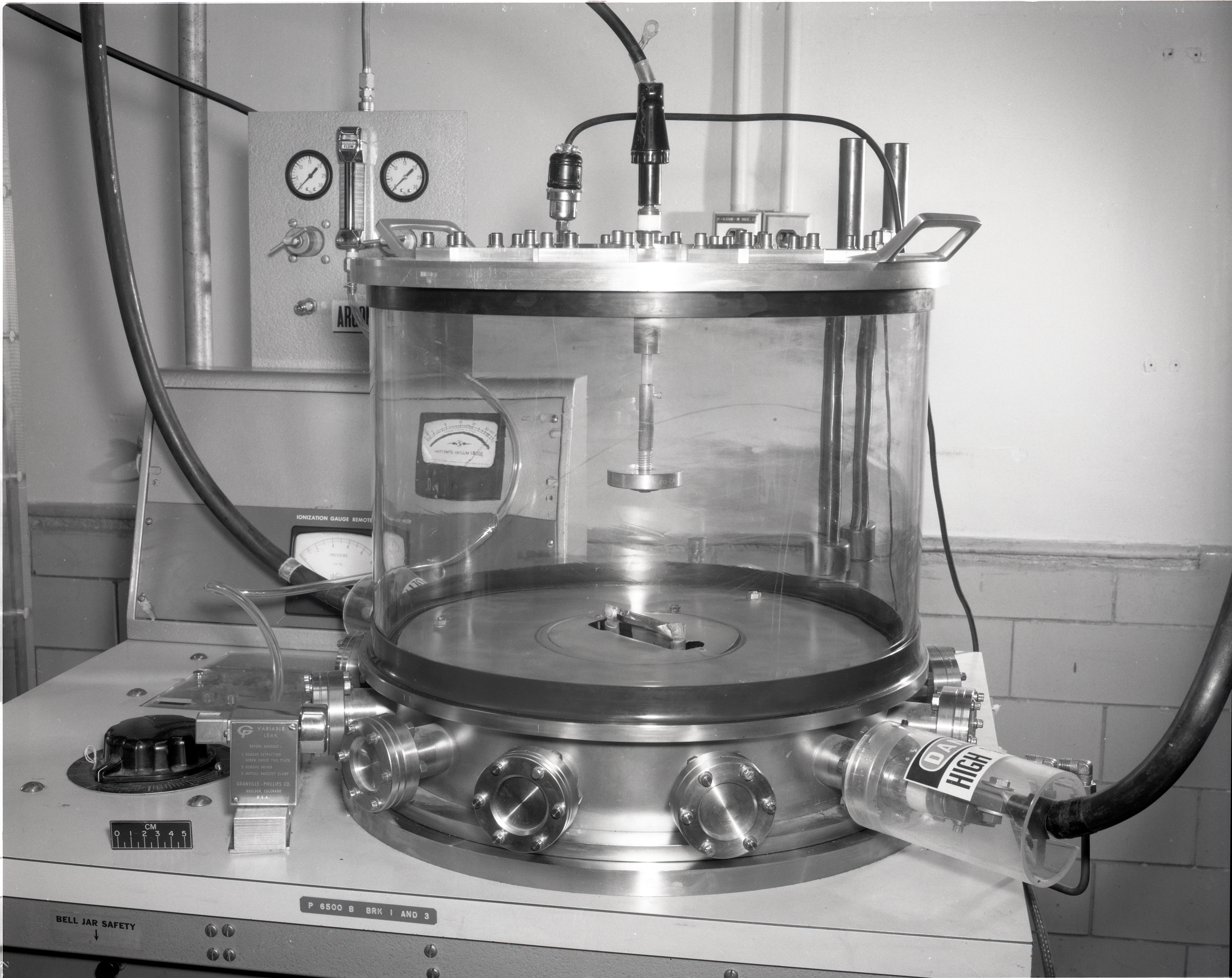
Ion plating rig

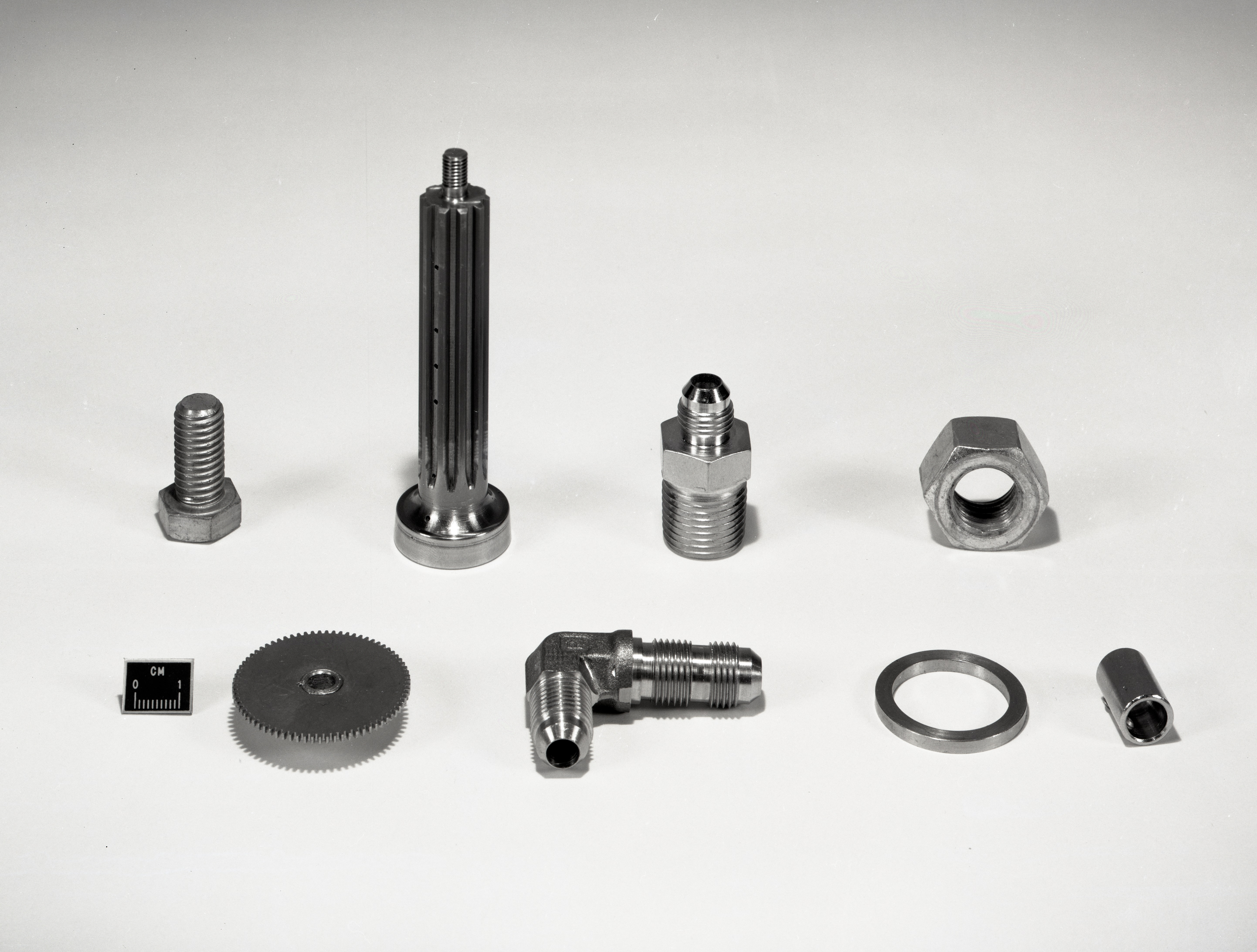
Ion plated fasteners

Ion plating (IP) is a physical vapor deposition (PVD) process that is sometimes called ion assisted deposition (IAD) or ion vapor deposition (IVD) and is a modified version of vacuum deposition. Ion plating uses concurrent or periodic bombardment of the substrate, and deposits film by atomic-sized energetic particles called ions. Bombardment prior to deposition is used to sputter clean the substrate surface. During deposition the bombardment is used to modify and control the properties of the depositing film. It is important that the bombardment be continuous between the cleaning and the deposition portions of the process to maintain an atomically clean interface. If this interface is not properly cleaned, then it can result into a weaker coating or poor adhesion.

They are many different processes to vacuum deposited coatings in which they are used for various applications such as corrosion resistance and wear on the material.

== Process ==
In ion plating, the energy, flux and mass of the bombarding species along with the ratio of bombarding particles to depositing particles are important processing variables. The depositing material may be vaporized either by evaporation, sputtering (bias sputtering), arc vaporization or by decomposition of a chemical vapor precursor chemical vapor deposition (CVD). The energetic particles used for bombardment are usually ions of an inert or reactive gas, or, in some cases, ions of the condensing film material ("film ions"). Ion plating can be done in a plasma environment where ions for bombardment are extracted from the plasma or it may be done in a vacuum environment where ions for bombardment are formed in a separate ion gun. The latter ion plating configuration is often called Ion Beam Assisted Deposition (IBAD). By using a reactive gas or vapor in the plasma, films of compound materials can be deposited.

Ion plating is used to deposit hard coatings of compound materials on tools, adherent metal coatings, optical coatings with high densities, and conformal coatings on complex surfaces.

=== Pros ===
- Better surface coverage than other methods (Physical vapor deposition, Sputter deposition).
- More energy available on the surface of the bombarding species, resulting in more complete bonding.
- Flexibility with the level of ion bombardment.
- Improved chemical reactions when supplying plasma and energy to surface of the bombarding species.
- Durability of material improves at least 8 times more.

=== Cons ===
- Increased variables to take into account when compared to other techniques.
- Uniformity of plating not always consistent
- Excessive heating to the substrate
- Compressive stress
- This process is costly and time consuming

== Background information on ion plating ==
The ion plating process was first described in the technical literature by Donald M. Mattox of Sandia National Laboratories in 1964. As described by this article, it was used initially to enhance film adhesion and improve surface coverage.

== History ==
This process was first used in the 1960's and was continued throughout the time by using specific cleaning techniques and film growth reactive and quasi reactive deposition techniques. Sputter cleaning has been used since the 1950's for cleaning scientific surfaces. In the 1970's, high-rate DC magnetron sputtering has shown that bombardment densified the films and helped the hardness of materials. As we further progressed, we learned in 1983 that bombardment was used as concurrent bombardment of inserted gas ions.

== See also ==
- List of coating techniques
