= Sputtering =

Emission of surface atoms through energetic particle bombardment

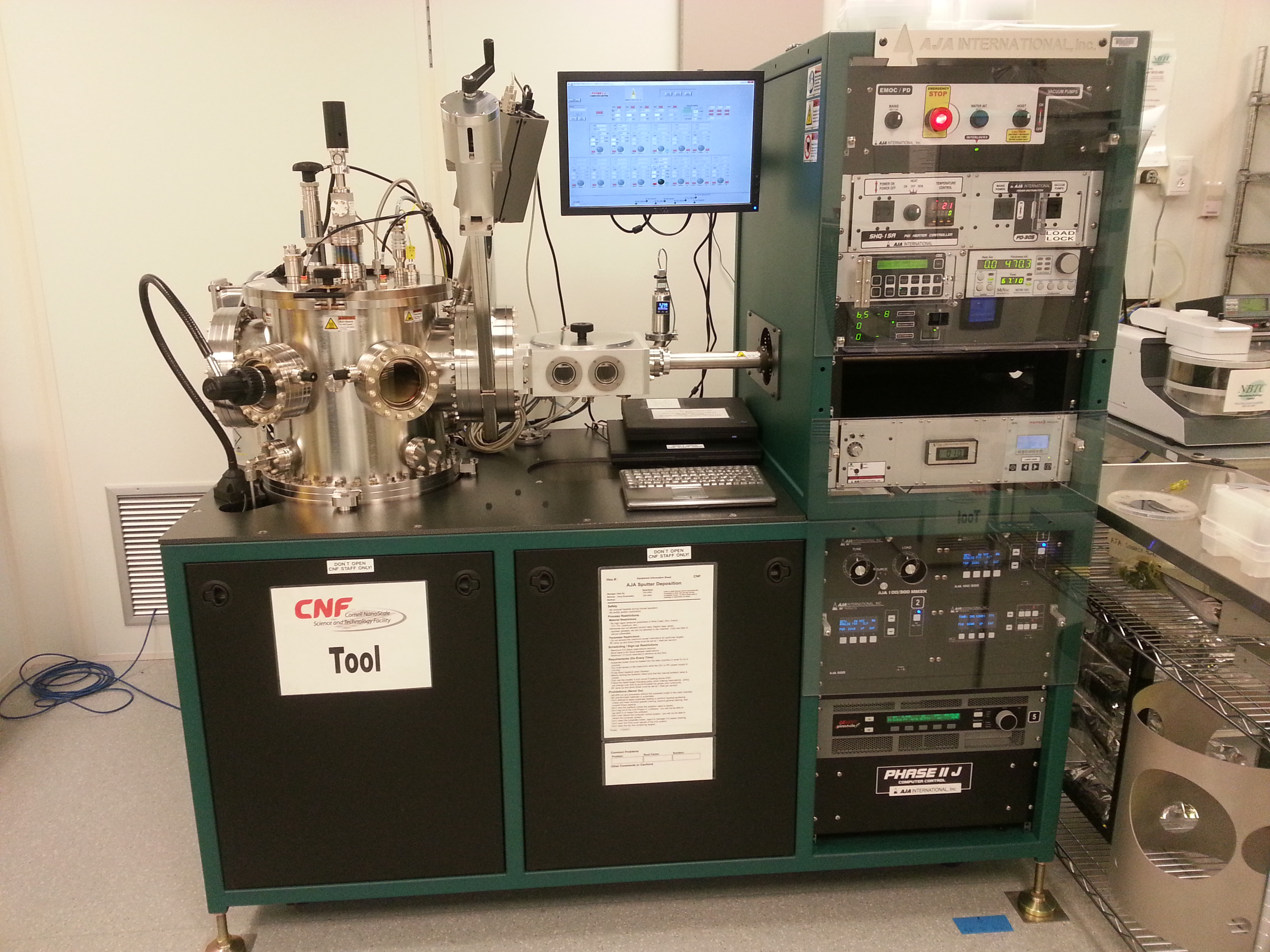
A commercial AJA Orion sputtering system at Cornell NanoScale Science and Technology Facility

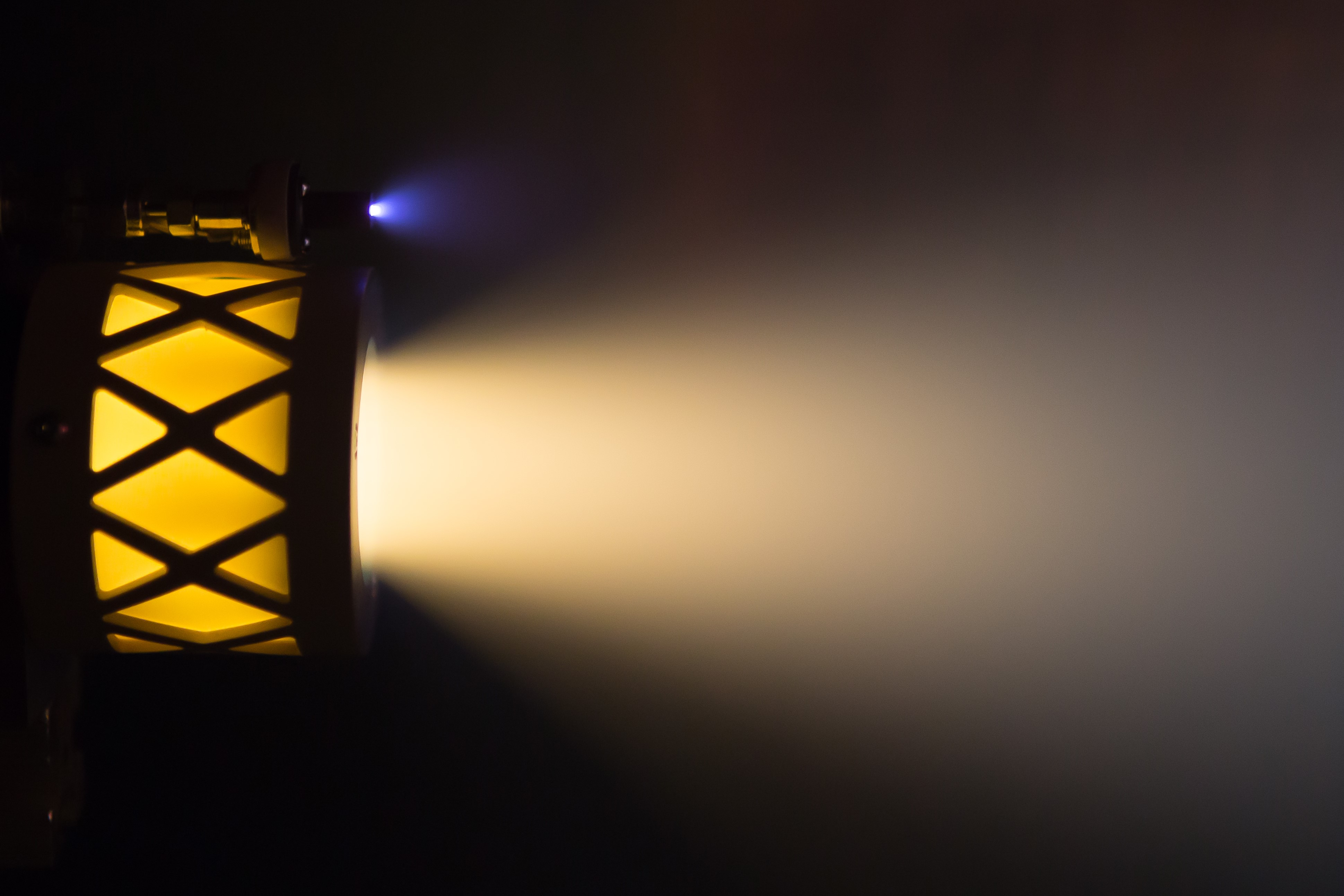
Ion thruster operating on iodine (yellow) using a xenon (blue) hollow cathode. High-energy ions emitted from plasma thrusters sputter material off the surrounding test chamber, causing problems for ground testing of high-power thrusters.

In physics, sputtering is a phenomenon in which microscopic particles of a solid material are ejected from its surface, after the material is itself bombarded by energetic particles of a plasma or gas. It occurs naturally in outer space, and can be an unwelcome source of wear in precision components. However, the fact that it can be made to act on extremely fine layers of material is utilised in science and industry—there, it is used to perform precise etching, carry out analytical techniques, and deposit thin film layers in the manufacture of optical coatings, semiconductor devices and nanotechnology products. It is a physical vapor deposition technique.

== Physics ==
When energetic ions collide with atoms of a target material, an exchange of momentum takes place between them.

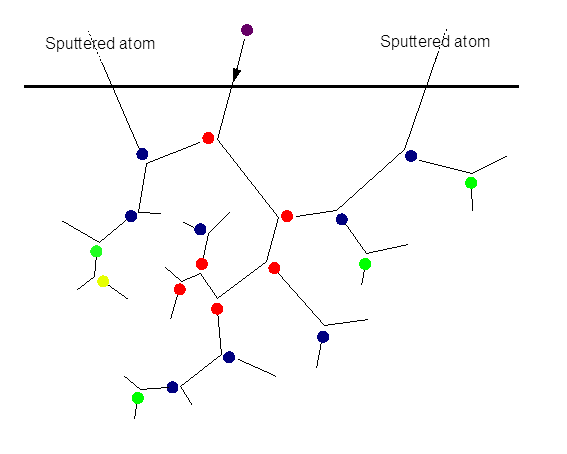
Sputtering from a linear collision cascade. The thick line illustrates the position of the surface, with everything below it being atoms inside of the material, and the thinner lines the ballistic movement paths of the atoms from beginning until they stop in the material. The purple circle is the incoming ion. Red, blue, green and yellow circles illustrate primary, secondary, tertiary and quaternary recoils, respectively. Two of the atoms happen to move out from the sample, i.e. they are sputtered.

These ions, known as "incident ions", set off collision cascades in the target. Such cascades can take many paths; some recoil back toward the surface of the target. If a collision cascade reaches the surface of the target, and its remaining energy is greater than the target's surface binding energy, an atom will be ejected. This process is known as "sputtering". If the target is thin (on an atomic scale), the collision cascade can reach through to its back side; the atoms ejected in this fashion are said to escape the surface binding energy "in transmission".

The average number of atoms ejected from the target per incident ion is called the "sputter yield". The sputter yield depends on several things: the angle at which ions collide with the surface of the material, how much energy they strike it with, their masses, the masses of the target atoms, and the target's surface binding energy. If the target possesses a crystal structure, the orientation of its axes with respect to the surface is an important factor.

The ions that cause sputtering come from a variety of sources—they can come from plasma, specially constructed ion sources, particle accelerators, outer space (e.g. solar wind), or radioactive materials (e.g. alpha radiation).

A model for describing sputtering in the cascade regime for amorphous flat targets is Thompson's analytical model. An algorithm that simulates sputtering based on a quantum mechanical treatment including electrons stripping at high energy is implemented in the program TRIM.

Another mechanism of physical sputtering is called "heat spike sputtering". This can occur when the solid is dense enough, and the incoming ion heavy enough, that collisions occur very close to each other. In this case, the binary collision approximation is no longer valid, and the collisional process should be understood as a many-body process. The dense collisions induce a heat spike (also called thermal spike), which essentially melts a small portion of the crystal. If that portion is close enough to its surface, large numbers of atoms may be ejected, due to liquid flowing to the surface and/or microexplosions. Heat spike sputtering is most important for heavy ions (e.g. Xe or Au or cluster ions) with energies in the keV–MeV range bombarding dense but soft metals with a low melting point (Ag, Au, Pb, etc.). The heat spike sputtering often increases nonlinearly with energy, and can for small cluster ions lead to dramatic sputtering yields per cluster of the order of 10,000. For animations of such a process see "Re: Displacement Cascade 1" in the external links section.

Physical sputtering has a well-defined minimum energy threshold, equal to or larger than the ion energy at which the maximum energy transfer from the ion to a target atom equals the binding energy of a surface atom. That is to say, it can only happen when an ion is capable of transferring more energy into the target than is required for an atom to break free from its surface.

This threshold is typically somewhere in the range of ten to a hundred eV.

Preferential sputtering can occur at the start when a multicomponent solid target is bombarded and there is no solid state diffusion. If the energy transfer is more efficient to one of the target components, or it is less strongly bound to the solid, it will sputter more efficiently than the other. If in an AB alloy the component A is sputtered preferentially, the surface of the solid will, during prolonged bombardment, become enriched in the B component, thereby increasing the probability that B is sputtered such that the composition of the sputtered material will ultimately return to AB.

== Electronic sputtering ==
The term electronic sputtering can mean either sputtering induced by energetic electrons (for example in a transmission electron microscope), or sputtering due to very high-energy or highly charged heavy ions that lose energy to the solid, mostly by electronic stopping power, where the electronic excitations cause sputtering. Electronic sputtering produces high sputtering yields from insulators, as the electronic excitations that cause sputtering are not immediately quenched, as they would be in a conductor. One example of this is Jupiter's ice-covered moon Europa, where a MeV sulfur ion from Jupiter's magnetosphere can eject up to 10,000 H_{2}O molecules.

== Potential sputtering ==
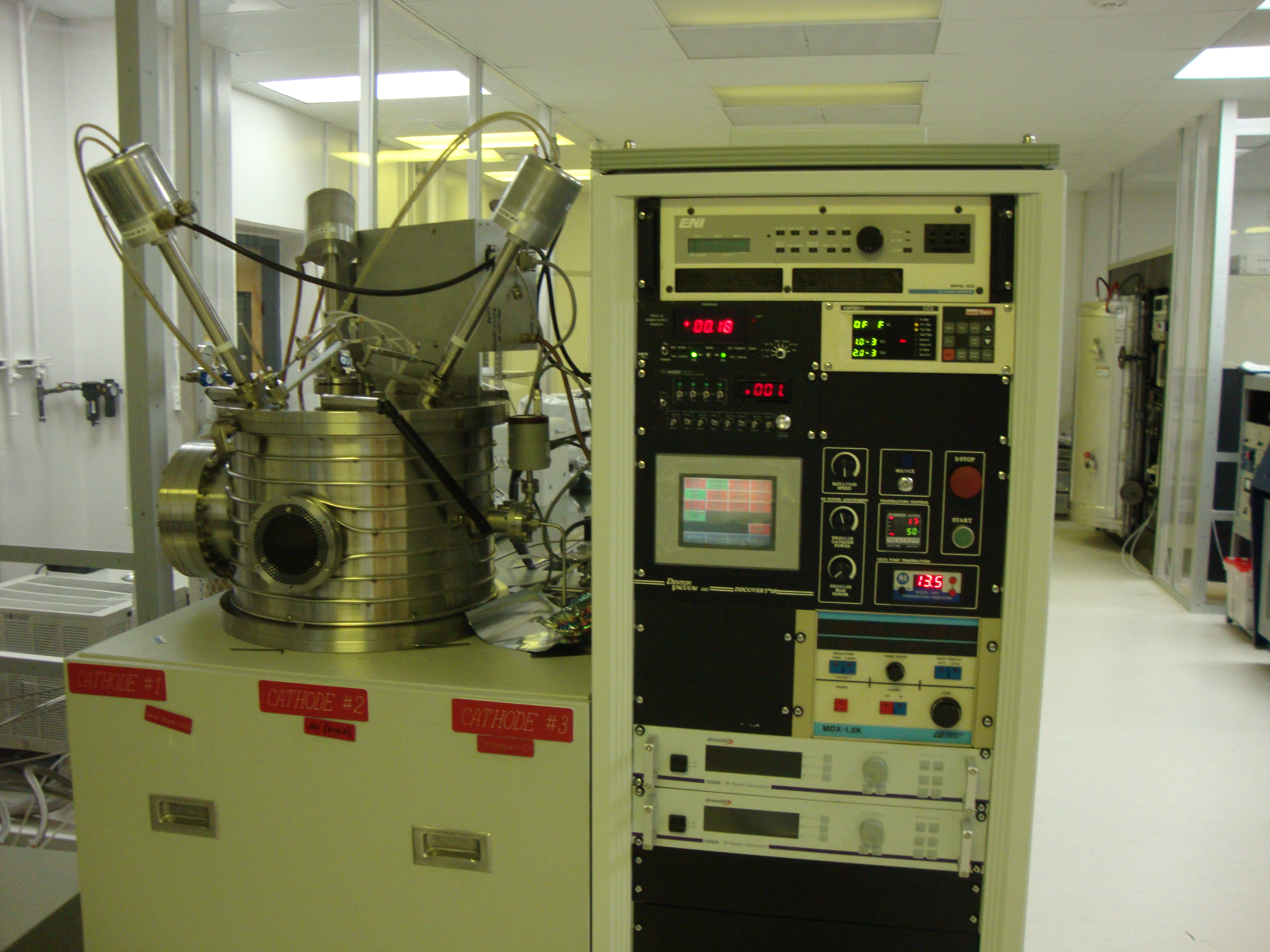
A commercial sputtering system

In the case of multiple charged projectile ions a particular form of electronic sputtering can take place that has been termed potential sputtering. In these cases the potential energy stored in multiply charged ions (i.e., the energy necessary to produce an ion of this charge state from its neutral atom) is liberated when the ions recombine during impact on a solid surface (formation of hollow atoms). This sputtering process is characterized by a strong dependence of the observed sputtering yields on the charge state of the impinging ion and can already take place at ion impact energies well below the physical sputtering threshold. Potential sputtering has only been observed for certain target species and requires a minimum potential energy.

== Etching and chemical sputtering ==
Removing atoms by sputtering with an inert gas is called ion milling or ion etching.

Sputtering can also play a role in reactive-ion etching (RIE), a plasma process carried out with chemically active ions and radicals, for which the sputtering yield may be enhanced significantly compared to pure physical sputtering. Reactive ions are frequently used in secondary ion mass spectrometry (SIMS) equipment to enhance the sputter rates. The mechanisms causing the sputtering enhancement are not always well understood, although the case of fluorine etching of Si has been modeled well theoretically.

Sputtering observed to occur below the threshold energy of physical sputtering is also often called chemical sputtering. The mechanisms behind such sputtering are not always well understood, and may be hard to distinguish from chemical etching. At elevated temperatures, chemical sputtering of carbon can be understood to be due to the incoming ions weakening bonds in the sample, which then desorb by thermal activation. The hydrogen-induced sputtering of carbon-based materials observed at low temperatures has been explained by H ions entering between C-C bonds and thus breaking them, a mechanism dubbed swift chemical sputtering.

== Applications and phenomena ==
Sputtering only happens when the kinetic energy of the incoming particles is much higher than conventional thermal energies (≫ 1 eV). When done with direct current (DC sputtering), voltages of 3-5 kV are used. When done with alternating current (RF sputtering), frequencies are around the 14 MHz range.

=== Sputter cleaning ===
Surfaces of solids can be cleaned from contaminants by using physical sputtering in a vacuum. Sputter cleaning is often used in surface science, vacuum deposition and ion plating. In 1955 Farnsworth, Schlier, George, and Burger reported using sputter cleaning in an ultra-high-vacuum system to prepare ultra-clean surfaces for low-energy electron-diffraction (LEED) studies. Sputter cleaning became an integral part of the ion plating process. When the surfaces to be cleaned are large, a similar technique, plasma cleaning, can be used. Sputter cleaning has some potential problems such as overheating, gas incorporation in the surface region, bombardment (radiation) damage in the surface region, and the roughening of the surface, particularly if over done. It is important to have a clean plasma in order to not continually recontaminate the surface during sputter cleaning. Redeposition of sputtered material on the substrate can also give problems, especially at high sputtering pressures. Sputtering of the surface of a compound or alloy material can result in the surface composition being changed. Often the species with the least mass or the highest vapor pressure is the one preferentially sputtered from the surface.

=== Film deposition ===
Sputter deposition is a method of depositing thin films by sputtering that involves eroding material from a "target" source onto a "substrate", e.g. a silicon wafer, solar cell, optical component, or many other possibilities. Resputtering, in contrast, involves re-emission of the deposited material, e.g. SiO_{2} during the deposition also by ion bombardment.

Sputtered atoms are ejected into the gas phase but are not in their thermodynamic equilibrium state, and tend to deposit on all surfaces in the vacuum chamber. A substrate (such as a wafer, glass slide, 3D sample or flexible roll (in the case of Roll-to-roll processing - Wikipedia) placed in the chamber will be coated with a thin film. Sputtering deposition usually uses an argon plasma because argon, a noble gas, will not react with the target material.

=== Sputter damage ===
Sputter damage is usually defined during transparent electrode deposition on optoelectronic devices, which is usually originated from the substrate's bombardment by highly energetic species. The main species involved in the process and the representative energies can be listed as (values taken from):

- Sputtered atoms (ions) from the target surface (~10 eV), the formation of which mainly depends on the binding energy of the target material;
- Negative ions (originating from the carrier gas) formed in the plasma (~5–15 eV), the formation of which mainly depends on the plasma potential;
- Negative ions formed at the target surface (up to 400 eV), the formation of which mainly depends on the target voltage;
- Positive ions formed in the plasma (~15 eV), the formation of which mainly depends on the potential fall in front of a substrate at floating potential;
- Reflected atoms and neutralized ions from the target surface (20–50 eV), the formation of which mainly depends on the background gas and the mass of the sputtered element.

As seen in the list above, negative ions (e.g., O^{−} and In^{−} for ITO sputtering) formed at the target surface and accelerated toward the substrate acquire the largest energy, which is determined by the potential between target and plasma potentials. Although the flux of the energetic particles is an important parameter, high-energy negative O^{−} ions are additionally the most abundant species in plasma in case of reactive deposition of oxides. However, energies of other ions/atoms (e.g., Ar^{+}, Ar^{0}, or In^{0}) in the discharge may already be sufficient to dissociate surface bonds or etch soft layers in certain device technologies. In addition, the momentum transfer of high-energy particles from the plasma (Ar, oxygen ions) or sputtered from the target might impinge or even increase the substrate temperature sufficiently to trigger physical (e.g., etching) or thermal degradation of sensitive substrate layers (e.g. thin film metal halide perovskites).

This can affect the functional properties of underlying charge transport and passivation layers and photoactive absorbers or emitters, eroding device performance. For instance, due to sputter damage, there may be inevitable interfacial consequences such as pinning of the Fermi level, caused by damage-related interface gap states, resulting in the formation of Schottky-barrier impeding carrier transport. Sputter damage can also impair the doping efficiency of materials and the lifetime of excess charge carriers in photoactive materials; in some cases, depending on its extent, such damage can even lead to a reduced shunt resistance.

=== Etching ===
In the semiconductor industry sputtering is used to etch the target. Sputter etching is chosen in cases where a high degree of etching anisotropy is needed and selectivity is not a concern. One major drawback of this technique is wafer damage and high voltage use.

=== For analysis ===
Another application of sputtering is to etch away the target material. One such example occurs in secondary ion mass spectrometry (SIMS), where the target sample is sputtered at a constant rate. As the target is sputtered, the concentration and identity of sputtered atoms are measured using mass spectrometry. In this way the composition of the target material can be determined and even extremely low concentrations (20 μg/kg) of impurities detected. Furthermore, because the sputtering continually etches deeper into the sample, concentration profiles as a function of depth can be measured.

=== In space ===
Sputtering is one of the forms of space weathering, a process that changes the physical and chemical properties of airless bodies, such as asteroids and the Moon. On icy moons, especially Europa, sputtering of photolyzed water from the surface leads to net loss of hydrogen and accumulation of oxygen-rich materials that may be important for life. Sputtering is also one of the possible ways that Mars has lost most of its atmosphere and that Mercury continually replenishes its tenuous surface-bounded exosphere.

=== Optics ===
Due to its adaptability with a wide range of materials, Sputtering is used to create various types of coatings that enhance the performance of optical components. Anti-reflective coatings are applied to lenses and optical instruments to minimize light reflection and increase light transmission, which improves clarity and reduces glare. Sputtering is also used to deposit reflective coatings on mirrors, ensuring high reflectivity and durability for applications such as telescopes, cameras, and laser systems.

== See also ==
- Sintering
