= Physical vapor deposition =

Method of coating solid surfaces with thin films

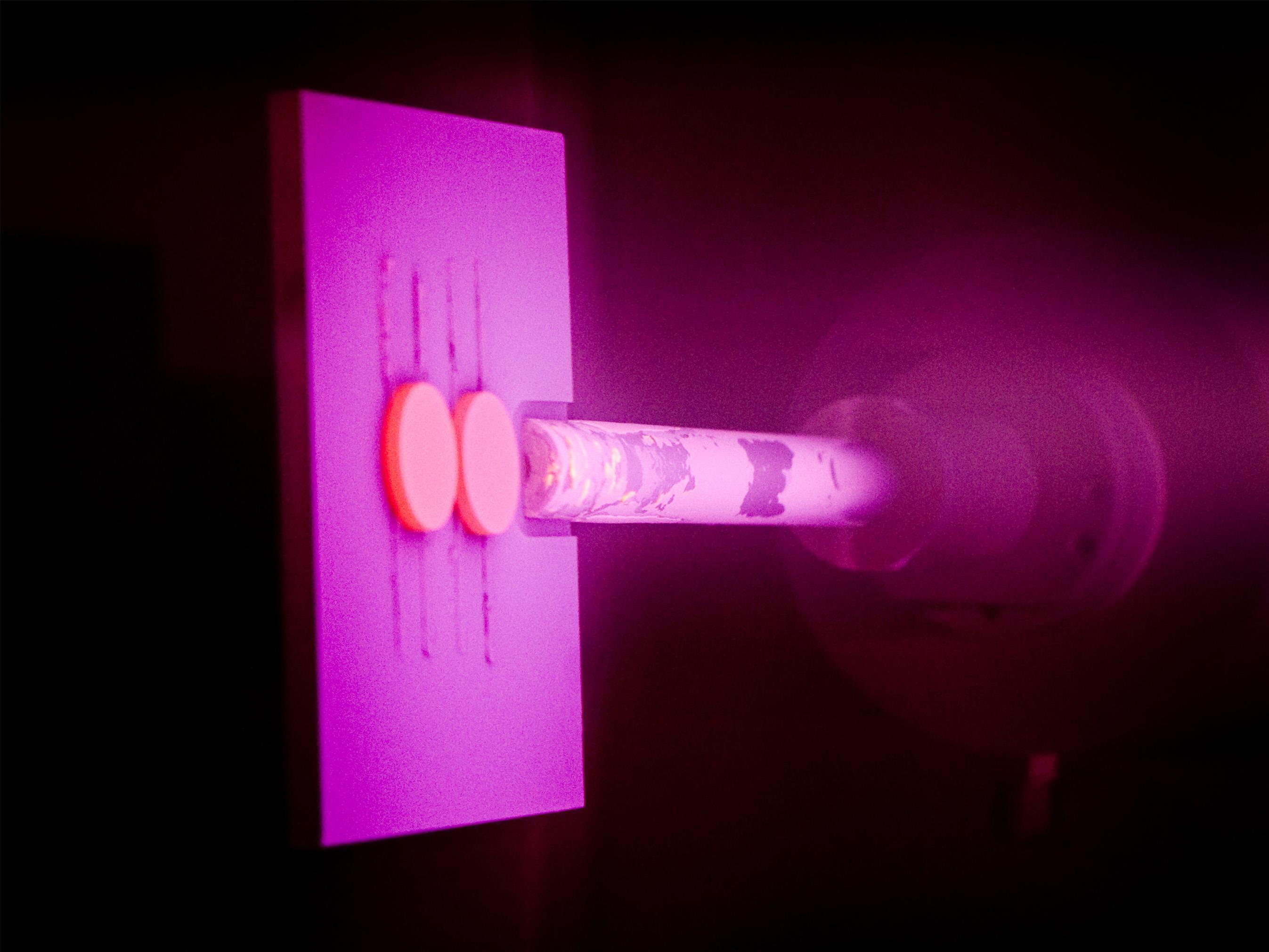
Inside the plasma-spray physical vapor deposition (PS-PVD) chamber ceramic powder is introduced into the plasma flame, which vaporizes it and then condenses it on the (cooler) workpiece to form the ceramic coating.

PVD process flow diagram

Physical vapor deposition (PVD), sometimes called physical vapor transport (PVT), describes a variety of vacuum deposition methods which can be used to produce thin films and coatings on substrates including metals, ceramics, glass, and polymers. PVD is characterized by a process in which the material transitions from a condensed phase to a vapor phase and then back to a thin-film condensed phase. The most common PVD processes are sputtering and evaporation. PVD is used in the manufacturing of items which require thin films for optical, mechanical, electrical, acoustic or chemical functions. Examples include semiconductor devices such as thin-film solar cells, microelectromechanical devices such as thin-film bulk acoustic resonator, aluminized PET film for food packaging and balloons, and titanium-nitride–coated cutting tools for metalworking. Besides PVD tools for fabrication, special smaller tools used mainly for scientific purposes have been developed.

The source material is, unavoidably, also deposited on most other surfaces in the vacuum chamber, including the fixtures holding the parts. This is called overshoot.

== Examples ==
- Cathodic arc deposition: A high-power electric arc discharged at the target (source) material blasts away some into highly ionized vapor to be deposited onto the workpiece.
- Electron-beam physical vapor deposition: The material to be deposited is heated to a high vapor pressure by electron bombardment in "high" vacuum and is transported by diffusion to be deposited by condensation on the (cooler) workpiece.
- Evaporative deposition: The material to be deposited is heated to a high vapor pressure by electrical resistance heating in "high" vacuum.
- Close-space sublimation: The material and substrate are placed close to one another and radiatively heated.
- Pulsed laser deposition: A high-power laser ablates material from the target into a vapor.
- Thermal laser epitaxy: A continuous-wave laser evaporates individual, free-standing elemental sources which then condense upon a substrate.
- Sputter deposition: A glow discharge (usually localized around the target by a magnet) bombards the material, sputtering some away as a vapor for subsequent deposition.
- Pulsed electron deposition: A highly energetic pulsed electron beam ablates material from the target, generating a plasma stream under nonequilibrium conditions.
- Sublimation sandwich method: This method is used for growing crystals such as silicon carbide (SiC).

=== Metrics and testing ===
Various techniques to characterize thin films can be used to measure the physical properties of PVD coatings, such as:

- Calo testing: measures coating thickness
- Nanoindentation: measures hardness of thin-film coatings
- Pin-on-disc testing: measures wear and friction coefficient
- Scratch testing: measures coating adhesion
- X-ray micro-analysis measures structural features and heterogeneity of elemental composition of the growth surfaces

== Comparison to other deposition techniques ==
=== Advantages ===
- PVD coatings are sometimes harder and more corrosion-resistant than coatings applied by electroplating processes. Most coatings have high temperature and good impact strength, excellent abrasion resistance and are so durable that protective topcoats are rarely necessary.
- PVD coatings have the ability to utilize virtually any type of inorganic and some organic coating materials on an equally diverse group of substrates and surfaces using a wide variety of finishes.
- PVD processes are often more environmentally friendly than traditional coating processes such as electroplating and painting.
- More than one technique can be used to deposit a given film.
- PVD can be performed at lower temperatures compared to chemical vapor deposition (CVD) and other thermal processes. This makes it suitable for coating temperature-sensitive substrates, such as plastics and certain metals, without causing damage or deformation.
- PVD technologies can be scaled from small laboratory setups to large industrial systems, offering flexibility for different production volumes and sizes. This scalability makes it accessible for both research and commercial applications.

=== Disadvantages ===
- Specific technologies can impose constraints; for example, the line-of-sight transfer is typical of most PVD coating techniques, however, some methods allow full coverage of complex geometries.
- Some PVD technologies operate at high temperatures and vacuums, requiring special attention by operating personnel and sometimes a cooling water system to dissipate large heat loads.

== Applications ==
=== Anisotropic glasses ===
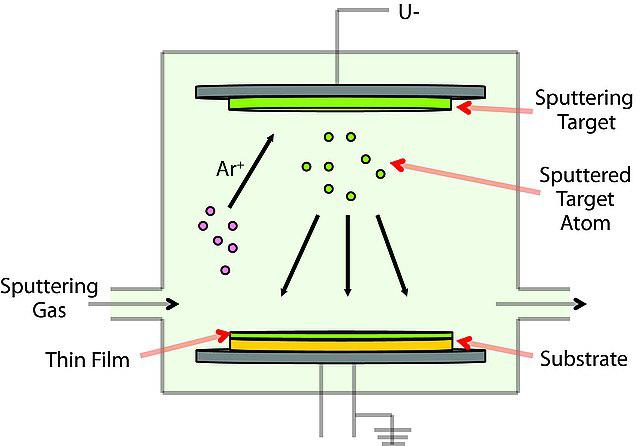
This figure gives a simple illustration of the process of PVD where the desired deposited gas molecules enter the chamber after being condensed, and then are condensed once again onto a thin film, such as the anisotropic glass.

PVD can be used as an application to make anisotropic glasses of low molecular weight for organic semiconductors. The parameter needed to allow the formation of this type of glass is molecular mobility and anisotropic structure at the free surface of the glass. The configuration of the polymer is important where it needs to be positioned in a lower energy state before the added molecules bury the material through a deposition. This process of adding molecules to the structure starts to equilibrate and gain mass and bulk out to have more kinetic stability. The packing of molecules here through PVD is face-on, meaning not at the long tail end, allows further overlap of pi orbitals as well which also increases the stability of added molecules and the bonds. The orientation of these added materials is dependent mainly on temperature for when molecules will be deposited or extracted from the molecule. The equilibration of the molecules is what provides the glass with its anisotropic characteristics. The anisotropy of these glasses is valuable as it allows a higher charge carrier mobility. This process of packing in glass in an anisotropic way is valuable due to its versatility and the fact that glass provides added benefits beyond crystals, such as homogeneity and flexibility of composition.

=== Decorative applications ===
By varying the composition and duration of the process, a range of colors can be produced by PVD on stainless steel. The resulting colored stainless steel product can appear as brass, bronze, and other metals or alloys. This PVD-colored stainless steel can be used as exterior cladding for buildings and structures, such as the Vessel sculpture in New York City and The Bund in Shanghai. It is also used for interior hardware, paneling, and fixtures, and is even used on some consumer electronics, like the Space Gray and Gold finishes of the iPhone and Apple Watch.

=== Cutting tools ===
PVD is used to enhance the wear resistance of steel cutting tools' surfaces and decrease the risk of adhesion and sticking between tools and a workpiece. This includes tools used in metalworking or plastic injection molding. The coating is typically a thin ceramic layer less than 4 μm that has very high hardness and low friction. It is necessary to have high hardness of workpieces to ensure dimensional stability of coating to avoid brittling. It is possible to combine PVD with a plasma nitriding treatment of steel to increase the load bearing capacity of the coating. Chromium nitride (CrN), titanium nitride (TiN), and titanium carbonitride (TiCN) may be used for PVD coating for plastic molding dies.

=== Other applications ===
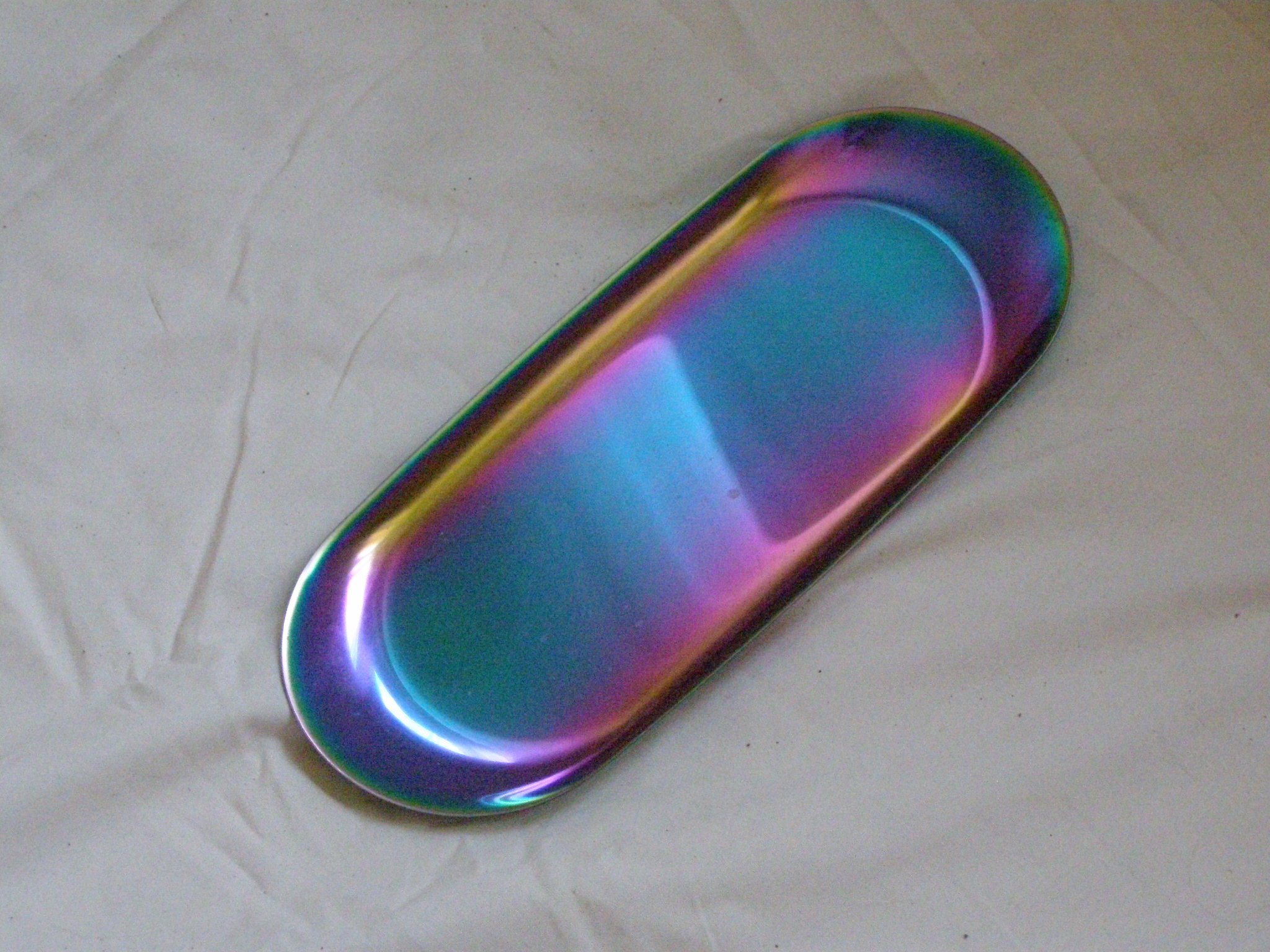
Stainless steel tray colored with PVD

PVD coatings are generally used to improve hardness, increase wear resistance, and prevent oxidation. They can also be used for aesthetic purposes. Thus, such coatings are used in a wide range of applications, such as:

- Aerospace industry
- Architectural ironmongery, panels, and sheets
- Automotive industry
- Dyes and molds
- Firearms
- Optics
- Watches
- Jewelry

== See also ==
- HPCVD – Thin-film deposition technique
- Chemical vapor deposition – Method used to apply surface coatings
- Ion plating – Method of coating solid surfaces with ions
- Thin-film deposition
- Ion-beam–assisted deposition – Materials engineering technique
