= Frequency selective surface =

Optical filter

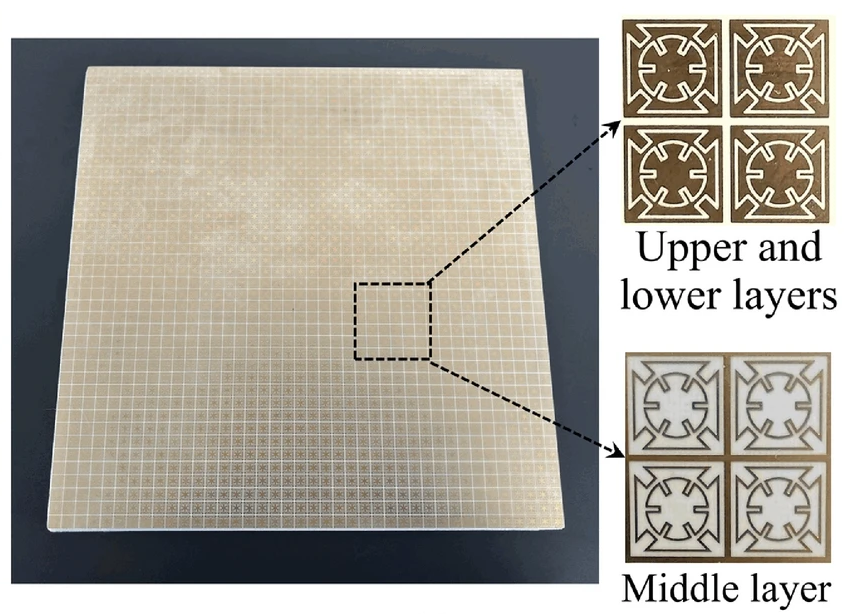
A frequency selective surface prototype with a band-pass response in three distinct frequency bands

A frequency-selective surface (FSS) is a thin, repetitive surface (such as the screen on a microwave oven) designed to reflect, transmit or absorb electromagnetic fields based on the frequency of the field. In this sense, an FSS is a type of optical filter or metal-mesh optical filter in which the filtering is accomplished by virtue of the regular, periodic (usually metallic, but sometimes dielectric) pattern on the surface of the FSS. Though not explicitly mentioned in the name, FSSs also have properties which vary with incidence angle and polarization as well; these are unavoidable consequences of the way in which FSSs are constructed. Frequency-selective surfaces have been most commonly used in the radio signals of the electromagnetic spectrum and find use in applications as diverse as the aforementioned microwave oven, antenna radomes and modern metamaterials. Sometimes frequency selective surfaces are referred to simply as periodic surfaces and are a 2-dimensional analog of the new periodic volumes known as photonic crystals.

Many factors are involved in understanding the operation and application of frequency selective surfaces. These include analysis techniques, operating principles, design principles, manufacturing techniques and methods for joining these structures into space, ground and airborne platforms.

== Bloch Wave MOM method ==
Bloch wave – MoM is a first principles technique for determining the photonic band structure of triply-periodic electromagnetic media such as photonic crystals. It is based on the 3-dimensional spectral domain method, specialized to triply-periodic media. This technique uses the method of moments (MoM) in combination with a Bloch wave expansion of the electromagnetic field to yield a matrix eigenvalue equation for the propagation bands. The eigenvalue is the frequency (for a given propagation constant) and the eigenvector is the set of current amplitudes on the surface of the scatterers. Bloch wave - MoM is similar in principle to the plane wave expansion method, but since it additionally employs the method of moments to produce a surface integral equation, it is significantly more efficient both in terms of the number of unknowns and the number of plane waves needed for good convergence.

Bloch wave - MoM is the extension to 3 dimensions of the spectral domain MoM method commonly used for analyzing 2D periodic structures such as frequency selective surfaces (FSS). In both cases, the field is expanded as a set of eigenfunction modes (either a Bloch wave in 3D or a discrete plane wave - aka Floquet mode - spectrum in 2D), and an integral equation is enforced on the surface of the scatterers in each unit cell. In the FSS case, the unit cell is 2-dimensional and in the photonic crystal case, the unit cell is 3-dimensional.

=== Field equations for 3D PEC photonic crystal structures ===
The Bloch wave - MoM approach will be illustrated here for the case of perfectly electrically conducting (PEC) structures admitting only electric current sources, J. However, it can also be readily expanded to dielectric structures, using the well-known interior and exterior equivalent problems commonly employed in ordinary spatial domain method of moments formulations. In dielectric problems, there are twice as many unknowns - J & M - and also twice as many equations to enforce - continuity of tangential E & H - at the dielectric interfaces.

For PEC structures, the electric field E is related to the vector magnetic potential A via the well-known relation:

$$\mathbf E ~ = ~ -j k \eta \left [ \mathbf A + \frac {1}{k^2} \nabla (\nabla \bullet \mathbf A) \right ]$$	1.1.1

and the vector magnetic potential is in turn related to the source currents via:

$$\nabla^2 \mathbf A + k^2 \mathbf A ~ = ~ -\mathbf J$$	1.1.2

where

$$k^2 ~ = ~ \omega^2 (\mu \varepsilon)$$	1.1.3

=== Bloch wave expansion of the fields ===
To solve equations (1.1.1) and (1.1.2) within the infinite periodic volume, we may assume a Bloch wave expansion for all currents, fields and potentials:

$$\mathbf J(x,y,z) ~ = ~ \sum_{mnp} ~ \mathbf J(\alpha_m,\beta_n, \gamma_p) ~ e^{j(\alpha_m x + \beta_n y + \gamma_p z)}$$	1.2.1a

$$\mathbf E(x,y,z) ~ = ~ \sum_{mnp} ~ \mathbf E(\alpha_m,\beta_n, \gamma_p) ~ e^{j(\alpha_m x + \beta_n y + \gamma_p z)}$$	1.2.1b

$$\mathbf A(x,y,z) ~ = ~ \sum_{mnp} ~ \mathbf A(\alpha_m,\beta_n, \gamma_p) ~ e^{j(\alpha_m x + \beta_n y + \gamma_p z)}$$	1.2.1c

where for simplicity, we assume an orthogonal lattice in which α only depends on m, β only depends on n and γ only depends on p. With this assumption,

$$\alpha_m ~ = ~ k_0 ~ \sin \theta_0 ~ \cos \phi_0 ~ + ~ \frac{2m\pi}{l_x}$$	1.2.2a

$$\beta_n ~ = ~ k_0 ~ \sin \theta_0 ~ \sin \phi_0 ~ + ~ \frac{2n\pi}{l_y}$$	1.2.2b

$$\gamma_p ~ = ~ k_0 ~ \cos \theta_0 ~ + ~ \frac{2p\pi}{l_z}$$	1.2.2c

and,

$$k_0 ~ = ~ 2\pi/\lambda$$	1.2.3

where l_{x}, l_{y}, l_{z} are the unit cell dimensions in the x,y,z directions respectively, λ is the effective wavelength in the crystal and θ_{0}, φ_{0} are the directions of propagation in spherical coordinates.

The quantity k in equations (1.1.1) and (1.1.2) comes originally from the time derivative in Maxwell's equations and is the free space propagation constant (actually, the propagation constant of whatever dielectric medium the metallic scatterers are embedded in), proportional to frequency as in equation (1.1.3). On the other hand, k_{0} in the equations above comes from the assumed Bloch wave solution given by equations (1.2.1) & (1.2.2). As a result, it represents the propagation constant inside the periodic medium, inversely proportional to wavelength. These two k's, i.e. the free space propagation constant (proportional to frequency) and the propagation constant of the Bloch wave (inversely proportional to wavelength), are in general different thereby allowing for dispersion in the solution. The band diagram is essentially a plot of k as a function of k_{0}.

The Bloch wave expansions in equations (1.2.1) are nothing more than exponential Fourier series multiplied by the cell-to-cell propagation factor: $e^{j(\alpha_0 x + \beta_0 y + \gamma_0 z)}.$ The Bloch wave expansions are chosen since any field solution within an infinite periodic volume must have the same periodicity as the medium itself, or stated another way, the fields in neighboring cells must be identical up to a (real or complex) propagation factor. In passbands the propagation factor is an exponential function with purely imaginary argument and in the stop bands (or band gaps) it is a decaying exponential function whose argument has a real component.

The wave numbers α_{0}, β_{0} and γ_{0} satisfy the relations: $| \alpha_0 | ~ \le ~ \frac{\pi}{l_x} ~ , ~~~~ | \beta_0 | ~ \le ~ \frac{\pi}{l_y} ~ , ~~~~ | \gamma_0 | ~ \le ~ \frac{\pi}{l_z} ~~~~$ and outside of these ranges, the bands are periodic.

The Bloch waves are periodic functions of space, with periods l_{x}, l_{y}, l_{z} and the bands are periodic functions of wavenumber, with periods: $\frac{2\pi}{l_x}$, $\frac{2\pi}{l_y}$ and $\frac{2\pi}{l_z}$

=== Integral equation for PEC media ===
Substituting equations (1.2.1) into (1.1.1) and (1.1.2) yields the spectral domain Greens function relating the radiated electric field to its source currents:

$$\mathbf E(\alpha_m,\beta_n, \gamma_p) ~ = ~ \frac {jk\eta}{k^2-\alpha_m^2-\beta_n^2-\gamma_p^2} ~ \mathbf G_{mnp} ~ \mathbf J(\alpha_m,\beta_n, \gamma_p)$$	1.3.1

where,

$$\mathbf G_{mnp} ~ = ~ \begin{pmatrix} 1-\frac{\alpha_m^2}{k^2} & -\frac{\alpha_m \beta_n}{k^2} & -\frac{\alpha_m \gamma_p}{k^2} \\ -\frac{\alpha_m \beta_n}{k^2} & 1- \frac {\beta_n^2}{k^2} & -\frac{\beta_n \gamma_p}{k^2} \\ -\frac{\alpha_m \gamma_p}{k^2} & - \frac {\beta_n \gamma_p}{k^2} & 1- \frac {\gamma_p^2}{k^2} \end{pmatrix}$$	1.3.2

is the tensor Green's function in the spectral domain. Note that the spatial domain convolution has been transformed into a simple multiplication in the spectral domain, consistent with the convolution theorem for Fourier transforms.

With this equation for the electric field, the electric field boundary condition (requiring that the total tangential electric field be zero on the surface of PEC scatterer) becomes:

$$\sum_{mnp} ~ \frac {1}{k^2-\alpha_m^2-\beta_n^2-\gamma_p^2} ~ \mathbf G_{mnp} ~ \mathbf J(\alpha_m,\beta_n,\gamma_p) ~ e^{j(\alpha_m x + \beta_n y + \gamma_p z)} ~ = ~ \mathbf 0$$	1.3.3

Since we are seeking characteristic modes (eigenmodes) of the structure, there is no impressed E-field on the RHS of this electric field integral equation (EFIE). Equation (1.3.3) is not strictly correct however, since it is only the tangential components of electric field that are actually zero on the surface of the PEC scatterer. This inexactness will be resolved presently, when we test this equation with the electric current basis functions - defined as residing on the surface of the scatterer.

=== Method of moments (MoM) solution ===
As is usual in the method of moments, the source currents are now expanded in terms of a sum over some known set of basis functions with unknown weighting coefficients J_{j}:

$$\mathbf J(x,y,z) ~ = ~ \sum_j ~ J_j ~ \mathbf J_j(x,y,z)$$	1.4.1

Different structures will have different sets of basis functions for representing the currents on the elements and as in the ordinary spatial domain method of moments, the solution (in this case, the band diagram) is a function of the set of basis functions used.

Substituting (1.4.1) into (1.3.3) and then testing the resulting equation with the i-th current basis function (i.e., dotting from the left and integrating over the domain of the i-th current basis function, thereby completing the quadratic form) produces the i-th row of the matrix eigenvalue equation for a 3-dimensional array of PEC scatterers as:

$$\sum_j ~ J_j ~\left[~ \sum_{mnp} ~ \frac {\mathbf J_i(-\alpha_m,-\beta_n,-\gamma_p) ~ \mathbf G_{mnp} ~ \mathbf J_j(\alpha_m,\beta_n, \gamma_p)}{k^2-\alpha_m^2-\beta_n^2-\gamma_p^2} \right]~ = ~ \mathbf 0$$	1.4.2

As in all MoM formulations, the reaction concept in electromagnetics was used in obtaining this equation. The electric field boundary/continuity conditions are "tested" (or enforced) by being integrated against electric current basis functions (for dielectric structures, the magnetic field continuity conditions are additionally tested by being integrated against magnetic current basis functions), and this is how the electric (and magnetic) field boundary conditions are converted into a matrix equation via the method of moments. This process is wholly analogous to that used to decompose a periodic function into its Fourier sine & cosine components, the only difference being that in this case the basis functions are not necessarily orthogonal, merely linearly independent.

This matrix equation is easy to implement and requires only that the 3D Fourier transform (FT) of the basis functions be computed, preferably in closed form. In fact, computing bands of a 3D photonic crystal with this method is no more difficult than computing reflection and transmission from a 2D periodic surface using the spectral domain method. This is because equation (1.4.2) is identical to the basic EFIE for a freestanding PEC FSS (see Frequency selective surface eq. 1.4.2), the only difference being the stronger singularity in 3D which significantly accelerates convergence of the triple sums, and of course the fact that the vectors are now 3-dimensional. As a result, an ordinary PC is sufficient to compute bands of many types of photonic crystals.

It's evident from (1.4.2) that the EFIE could become singular whenever the free space wavenumber is exactly equal to one of the wave numbers in any of the 3 periodic coordinate directions. This can happen for example when the free space wavelength exactly equals the lattice spacing. This is a statistically rare occurrence in computational practice and corresponds to a propagation anomaly similar to a Wood's reflection anomaly for gratings.

=== Computing bands ===
To compute bands of the crystal (i.e. k-k_{0} diagrams), successive values of frequency (k) are tried - in conjunction with pre-selected values of propagation constant (k_{0}) and propagation direction (θ_{0} & φ_{0}) - until a combination is found which drives the determinant of the matrix to zero. Equation (1.4.2) has been used to compute bands in various types of doped and undoped photonic crystals. Not surprisingly, doping photonic crystals with defects provides a means for designing photonic passbands, in just the same way that doping semiconductors with chemical impurities provides a means for designing electronic passbands.

For many subsectional basis functions, such as those having a half-sine or triangular shape along a round wire, the FT of the basis function for negative wave numbers -α, -β, -γ is the complex conjugate of the basis function FT for positive wave numbers. As a result, the matrix in eqn. (1.4.2) is Hermitian. And as a result of that, only half the matrix needs to be computed. And a second result is that the determinant is a purely real function of the real-valued wavenumber k. Zeroes generally occur at zero-crossings (inflection points, where curvature is zero), so a simple root-finding algorithm such as Newton's method is usually sufficient to find the roots to a very high degree of accuracy. If may still be useful however to plot the determinant as a function of k, to observe its behavior near the zeros.

As a matter of computational convenience, whenever the matrix is larger than 2×2 it's vastly more efficient to compute the determinant either by reducing the matrix to upper triangular form using QR decomposition or to compute the determinant by reducing to echelon form using Gaussian elimination, rather than trying to actually compute the determinant of the matrix directly.

== Analysis – first principles approaches ==
=== Spectral domain method of moments (overview and mathematical introduction) ===
==== Background ====
===== History =====
Historically, the first approach to solving for fields reflected and transmitted by FSS was the spectral domain method (SDM), and it is still a valuable tool even today [Scott(1989)]. The spectral domain method is known at Ohio State University as the periodic method of moments (PMM). The SDM starts out with an assumed Floquet/Fourier series solution for all fields, currents and potentials whereas the PMM starts out with a single scatterer, then adds in all of the scatterers in the infinite plane (in the spatial domain), then uses a transformation to yield the spectral domain representation of the fields. Both approaches are effectively the same approach, in the sense that they both assume an infinite planar structure which gives rise to a discrete Fourier series representation for the fields.

===== Advantages and disadvantages =====
The spectral domain method has one very important advantage over other – strictly numerical - solutions to Maxwell's equations for FSS. And that is that it yields a matrix equation of very small dimensionality, so it is amenable to solution on virtually any type of computer. The dimension of the matrix is determined by the number of current basis functions on each individual scatterer and can be as small as 1×1 for a dipole at or below resonance. The matrix elements however take longer to compute than with volumetric approaches such as FEM. Volumetric approaches require that a volume surrounding the unit cell be gridded accurately, and can require many thousands of elements for an accurate solution, though the matrices are usually sparse.

===== Floquet's principle =====
The spectral domain method is based on Floquet's principle, which implies that when an infinite, planar, periodic structure is illuminated by an infinite plane wave, then every unit cell in the periodic plane must contain exactly the same currents and fields, except for a phase shift, corresponding to the incident field phase. This principle allows all currents, fields and potentials to be written in terms of a modified Fourier series, which consists of an ordinary Fourier series multiplied by the incident field phase. If the periodic plane occupies the x-y plane, then the Fourier series is a 2-dimensional Fourier series in x, y.

===== Plane wave spectrum =====
As in Fourier optics, the Floquet–Fourier series expansion of fields and currents in the plane of the FSS leads immediately to the discrete plane wave spectrum representation of the fields on either side of the FSS.

==== Field equations for 2D PEC frequency selective surfaces ====
Perfectly electrically conducting (PEC) periodic surfaces are not only the most common but also the easiest to understand mathematically, as they admit only electric current sources J. This section presents the spectral domain method for analyzing a free-standing (no substrate) PEC FSS. The electric field E is related to the vector magnetic potential A via the well-known relation (Harrington [2001], Scott [1989], Scott [1997]):

$$\mathbf E ~ = ~ -j k \eta \left [ \mathbf A + \frac {1}{k^2} \nabla (\nabla \bullet \mathbf A) \right ]$$	2.1.1

and the vector magnetic potential is in turn related to the source currents via (Harrington [2001], Scott [1997]):

$$\nabla^2 \mathbf A + k^2 \mathbf A ~ = ~ -\mathbf J$$	2.1.2

where

$$k^2 ~ = ~ \omega^2 (\mu \varepsilon) = (2 \pi / \lambda)^2$$	2.1.3

==== Plane wave expansion of the fields in source-free media ====
Frequency-selective surfaces are frequently stratified in the direction normal to the plane of the surface. That is, all dielectrics are stratified and all metallic conductors are considered stratified as well, and they will be regarded as perfectly planar. As a result, we are excluding metallic vias (wires perpendicular to the plane of the FSS) which could potentially connect currents from different strata of the FSS structure. With this type of a stratified structure in mind, we can then use a plane wave expansion for the fields in and around the FSS, since plane waves are the eigenfunction solution to the vector wave equations in source-free media.

To solve equations (2.1.1) and (2.1.2) for a free-standing, doubly periodic surface, we consider an infinite 2D periodic surface occupying the entire x-y plane, and assume a discrete plane wave expansion for all currents, fields and potentials (Tsao [1982], Scott [1989], Fourier optics):

$$\mathbf J(x,y,z) ~ = ~ \sum_{mn} ~ \mathbf J(\alpha_m,\beta_n) ~ e^{j(\alpha_m x + \beta_n y \pm \gamma_{mn} z)}$$	2.2.1a

$$\mathbf E(x,y,z) ~ = ~ \sum_{mn} ~ \mathbf E(\alpha_m,\beta_n) ~ e^{j(\alpha_m x + \beta_n y \pm \gamma_{mn} z)}$$	2.2.1b

$$\mathbf A(x,y,z) ~ = ~ \sum_{mn} ~ \mathbf A(\alpha_m,\beta_n) ~ e^{j(\alpha_m x + \beta_n y \pm \gamma_{mn} z)}$$	2.2.1c

where for mathematical simplicity, we assume a rectangular lattice in which α only depends on m and β only depends on n. In the equations above,

$$\alpha_m ~ = ~ k ~ \sin \theta_0 ~ \cos \phi_0 ~ + ~ \frac{2m\pi}{l_x}$$	2.2.2a

$$\beta_n ~ = ~ k ~ \sin \theta_0 ~ \sin \phi_0 ~ + ~ \frac{2n\pi}{l_y}$$	2.2.2b

$$\gamma_{mn} ~ = ~ \sqrt{ ~ k^2 ~ - ~ \alpha_m^2 ~ - ~ \beta_n^2}$$	2.2.2c

and,

$$k ~ = ~ 2\pi/\lambda$$	2.2.3

where l_{x}, l_{y} are the dimensions of the unit cell in the x,y directions respectively, λ is the free space wavelength and θ_{0}, φ_{0} are the directions of an assumed incident plane wave, with the FSS regarded as lying in the x-y plane. In (2.2.2c), the root is taken which has a positive real part and non-positive (i.e., either negative or zero) imaginary part).

==== Integral equation for free-standing PEC FSS ====
Substituting equations (2.2.1) into (2.1.1) and (2.1.2) yields the spectral domain Greens function relating the radiated electric field to its source currents (Scott [1989]), where we now consider only those components of the field vectors lying in the plane of the FSS, the x-y plane:

$$\mathbf E(\alpha_m,\beta_n) ~ = ~ \frac {jk\eta}{\sqrt{k^2-\alpha_m^2-\beta_n^2}} ~ \mathbf G_{mn} ~ \mathbf J(\alpha_m,\beta_n)$$	2.3.1

where,

$$\mathbf G_{mn} ~ = ~ \begin{pmatrix} 1-\frac{\alpha_m^2}{k^2} & -\frac{\alpha_m \beta_n}{k^2} \\ -\frac{\alpha_m \beta_n}{k^2} & 1- \frac {\beta_n^2}{k^2} \end{pmatrix}$$	2.3.2

One notices the branch point singularity in the equation above (the inverse square root singularity), which is no problem thanks to the discrete spectrum, as long as the wavelength never equals the cell spacing. With this, the electric field boundary condition on the surface of PEC material within a unit cell becomes (Scott [1989]):

$$\sum_{mn} ~ \frac {1} \sqrt{k^2-\alpha_m^2-\beta_n^2} ~ \mathbf G_{mnp} ~ \mathbf J(\alpha_m,\beta_n) ~ e^{j(\alpha_m x + \beta_n y )} ~ = ~ - \mathbf E^{inc} (x,y)$$	2.3.3

where again, we are restricting our attention to the x,y components of currents and fields, which lie in the plane of the scatterer.

Equation (2.3.3) is not strictly correct, since only the tangential components of electric field are actually zero on the surface of the PEC scatterers. This inexactness will be resolved presently when (2.3.3) is tested with the current basis functions, defined as residing on the surface of the scatterer.

In this type of problem, the incident field is considered a plane wave expressed as

$$\mathbf E^{inc} (x,y) = ~ \mathbf E^{inc} (\alpha_0, \beta_0) ~ e^{j(\alpha_0 x + \beta_0 y )}$$	2.3.4

in the x-y plane.

==== Method of moments (MoM) solution ====
As is usual in the method of moments, we assume an expansion for the source currents over some known set of basis functions with unknown weighting coefficients J_{j} (Scott [1989]):

$$\mathbf J(x,y,z) ~ = ~ \sum_j ~ J_j ~ \mathbf J_j(x,y,z)$$	2.4.1

Substituting (2.4.1) into (2.3.3) and then testing the resulting equation with the i-th current basis function (i.e., dotting from the left and integrating over the domain of the i-th current basis function, thereby completing the quadratic form) produces the i-th row of the matrix equation as (Scott [1989]):

$$\sum_j ~ J_j ~\left[~ \sum_{mn} ~ \frac {\mathbf J_i(-\alpha_m,-\beta_n) ~ \mathbf G_{mn} ~ \mathbf J_j(\alpha_m,\beta_n)} \sqrt{k^2-\alpha_m^2-\beta_n^2} \right]~ = ~- \mathbf J_i(-\alpha_0, -\beta_0) ~ \bullet ~ \mathbf E^{inc} (\alpha_0, \beta_0)$$	2.4.2

This is the i-th row of the electric field integral equation (EFIE) for a free-standing metallic FSS. Equation (2.4.2) may be readily modified for analyzing FSS with surrounding dielectric sheets (substrates and/or superstrates), and even complex multi-layer FSS structures (Scott [1989]). All of these matrix equations are very simple to implement and require only that the 2D Fourier transform (FT) of the basis functions be computed, preferably in closed form. There is a striking similarity between eqn. (2.4.2) above, and the Bloch wave - MoM method eqn. (2.4.2) for computing ω–β diagrams for triply-periodic electromagnetic media such as photonic crystals (Scott [1998], Scott [2002], available on researchgate.net). Given this similarity, eqn. (2.4.2) and its numerous variants in dielectric-layered FSS structures (Scott [1989]) could also be used (with the RHS set to zero) to find surface waves in complex FSS structures.

The RWG (Rao–Wilton–Glisson) basis functions (Rao, Wilton and Glisson [1982]) have a transform that is readily computed using area coordinates.

==== Computing reflection and transmission coefficients ====
Equations (2.4.2) and (2.3.1) have been used to solve for the electric current J and then the scattered fields E to compute reflection and transmission from various types of FSS (Scott[1989]). The reflected field is due to the currents on the FSS (the field radiated by the FSS) and the transmitted field is equal to the radiated field plus the incident field, and differs from the reflected field only for the m = 0, n = 0 order (the zero order).

Or else the numerical method with periodical boundary conditions can serve as a powerful tool to compute the coefficients of FSS.

== Equivalent circuits – introduction ==
=== Background ===
==== Overview ====
For wavelengths greater than the FSS lattice dimensions, only one – out of the infinitude of Floquet modes – actually propagates. All of the others are (exponentially decaying in the z-direction, normal to the plane of the FSS, since the quantity under the root in (2.2c) is negative. And for FSS spacings greater than roughly a tenth of a wavelength or so, these evanescent wave fields have negligible effect on FSS stack performance. So, for practical purposes, in the frequency bands for which we'll be likely to use the FSS, a single propagating wave will be sufficient to capture the significant properties of a multi-layer FSS stack. This single propagating wave can be modeled in terms of an equivalent transmission line.

The FSS sheet may be represented in terms of lumped RLC networks placed in parallel across the transmission line. The shunt admittance FSS model is exact only for an infinitesimally thin FSS, for which the tangential electric field is continuous across the FSS; for finite thickness FSS, a tee or pi network can be used as a better approximation.

==== Free space as a transmission line ====
Both free space and transmission lines admit TEM traveling wave solutions, and even the TE/TM plane waves in free space can be modeled using equivalent transmission line models. The main thing is that both free space and transmission lines admit traveling wave solutions with a z-dependence of the form:
$$e^{\pm jk z }$$

One can construct equivalent transmission lines as follows:

For TEM waves,
$$Z_0 ~=~ \sqrt { \frac {\mu_0} {\varepsilon_0}}$$
$$k_0 ~=~ \omega \sqrt { \mu_0 \varepsilon_0}$$

For TE waves,
$$Z_0 ~=~ \sqrt { \frac {\mu_0} {\varepsilon_0}} ~/~ \cos \theta$$
$$k_0 ~=~\cos \theta ~ \omega \sqrt { \mu_0 \varepsilon_0}$$

For TM waves,
$$Z_0 ~=~ \sqrt { \frac {\mu_0} {\varepsilon_0}} ~ \cos \theta$$
$$k_0 ~=~\cos \theta ~ \omega \sqrt { \mu_0 \varepsilon_0}$$
where θ is the angle off-normal that the incident wave makes with respect to the FSS. Z_{0} for free space is 377 Ohms.

==== Shunt circuit resonators and FSS ====
Circuit elements placed in parallel across an equivalent transmission line have some factors in common with thin FSS. The continuity of tangential electric field condition for thin FSS mirrors the voltage continuity condition on either side of the shunt circuit elements. The magnetic field jump condition for the FSS mirrors the Kirchhoff current division law for the equivalent circuit. For sufficiently thick FSS sheets, a more general pi or tee model will likely be required for good approximation to the real FSS.

==== Resonant circuits can approximately model resonant scatterers. ====
For all but the most tightly packed dipole arrays (the brickwork-like "gangbuster" low-pass filters), a first order understanding of FSS operation can be achieved by simply considering the scattering properties of a single periodic element in free space. A dipole or patch in free space will strongly reflect energy for wavelengths comparable in size to the object itself, for example when the dipole is 1/2 wavelength in length. For frequencies below this first resonance (and for frequencies between the first and second resonance), the object will reflect little energy. So, this resonance phenomenon observed with dipoles and patches leads naturally to the notion of modeling them as a resonant circuit connected in parallel across a transmission line - in this case the element is a series connection of a capacitor and inductor, which produces a reflective short circuit at resonance. This type of structure would be known as a band-reject or band-stop filter. Bandpass filters may be constructed using apertures in conducting planes, which are modeled as a shunt element consisting of a parallel connection of an inductor and a capacitor.

One-dimensional line gratings can be modeled as shunt inductors (for polarization parallel to the lines) or shunt capacitors (for polarization perpendicular to the lines). Tightly packed "gangbuster" dipole arrays are lowpass structures that can be modeled using shunt capacitors.

==== Resonant circuit R,L,C values must be determined from first principles analysis ====
The exact circuit topology and element values of an equivalent circuit for a FSS sheet have to be determined using first-principles codes. A bandpass mesh-type FSS sheet is a parallel connection of L,C and bandstop patch-type FSS sheet is a series connection of L,C and in both cases, the L,C values are determined from the center frequency and bandwidth of the filter.

=== Reflection and transmission properties of bandpass and bandstop FSS and equivalent circuits – introduction ===
The equivalent transmission line circuit models for FSS came into being from the observation that FSS yield reflection and transmission properties that are very similar to the reflection and transmission properties of inductors and capacitors placed in parallel across a transmission line.

==== Bandstop FSS filter equivalent circuit and reflection response ====
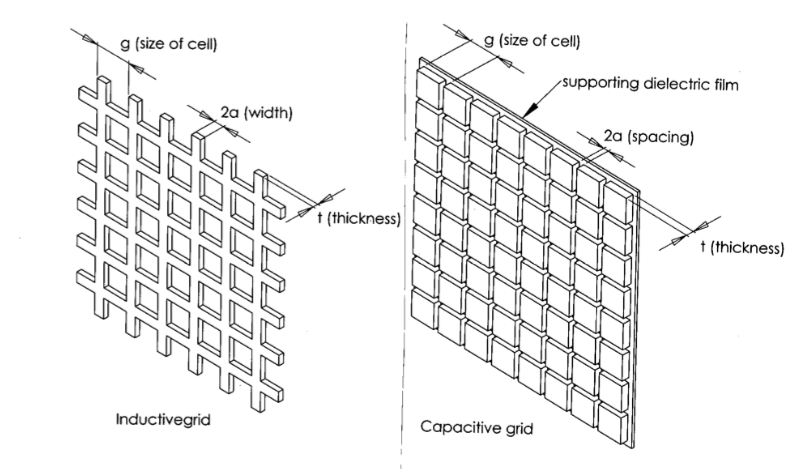
Bandspass mesh FSS (left) and bandstop patch FSS (right)

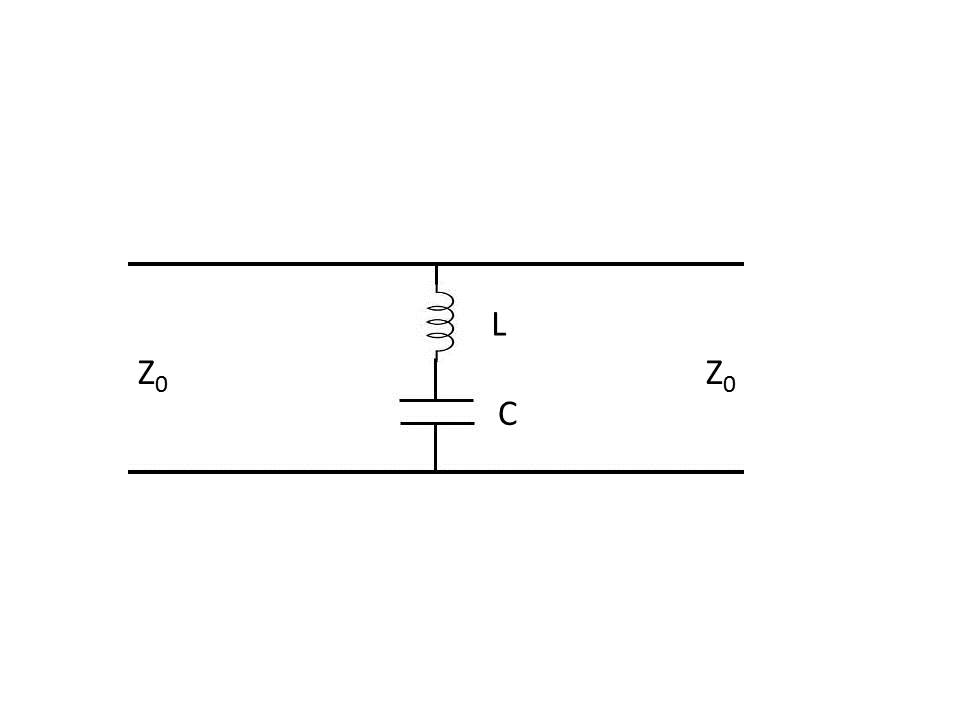
Equivalent circuit for patch-type bandstop FSS

The two fundamental types of FSS are shown in Fig. 2.4.1-1 to the right - the bandpass mesh-type FSS and the bandstop patch-type FSS (Metal-mesh optical filters). The equivalent circuit for a patch-type bandstop FSS is shown in Fig. 2.4.1-2. The impedance of the series connection of the inductor and the capacitor is (Desoer, Kuh [1984]):
$$Z_\text{shunt} ~ = ~ j \omega L ~ + ~ \frac {1} {j \omega C}$$
or,
$$Z_\text{shunt} ~ = ~ \frac { 1-\omega^2LC} {j \omega C}$$
and this series connection of an inductor and capacitor produces a zero impedance (short circuit) condition when
$$\omega_0^2 ~ = ~ \frac {1} {LC}$$

At the short circuit condition, all incident energy is reflected, and so this is the equivalent circuit of a resonant patch bandstop filter.

The magnitude of the reflection coefficient is:
$$|R| = \frac{\omega C Z_0} {\sqrt{\omega^2 C^2 Z_0^2 ~ + ~ 4~ (1~-~\omega^2 L C)^2 } }$$
where Z_{0} is the characteristic impedance of the transmission line.

The frequencies for the upper and lower 3 dB points are given as the solution to the equation:
$$\omega^2_{1,2}~=~ \frac {-b \pm \sqrt {b^2~-~4ac}} {2a}$$
where,
$$a ~=~ (LC)^2$$
$$b ~=~ -(C^2Z_0^2~/~4~+ ~2LC)$$
$$c ~=~ 1$$

So, if the center frequency and the width of the resonance are determined from first principles codes, the L,C of the equivalent circuit may be readily obtained by fitting the reflection response of the equivalent resonant circuit to the reflection response of the actual FSS, and in this way, the circuit parameters L,C are readily extracted. Once that is done, then we can use the equivalent circuit model for multi-layer FSS design. Any nearby dielectrics should be included in the equivalent circuit.

For small values of ω, the impedance of the inductor, jωL, is smaller than the impedance of the capacitor, 1/jωC, therefore the capacitor dominates the shunt impedance and so the patch-type bandstop FSS is capacitive below resonance. We'll use this fact in section 2.3.1 to design a lowpass FSS filter using equivalent circuits.

==== Bandpass FSS filter equivalent circuit and transmission response ====
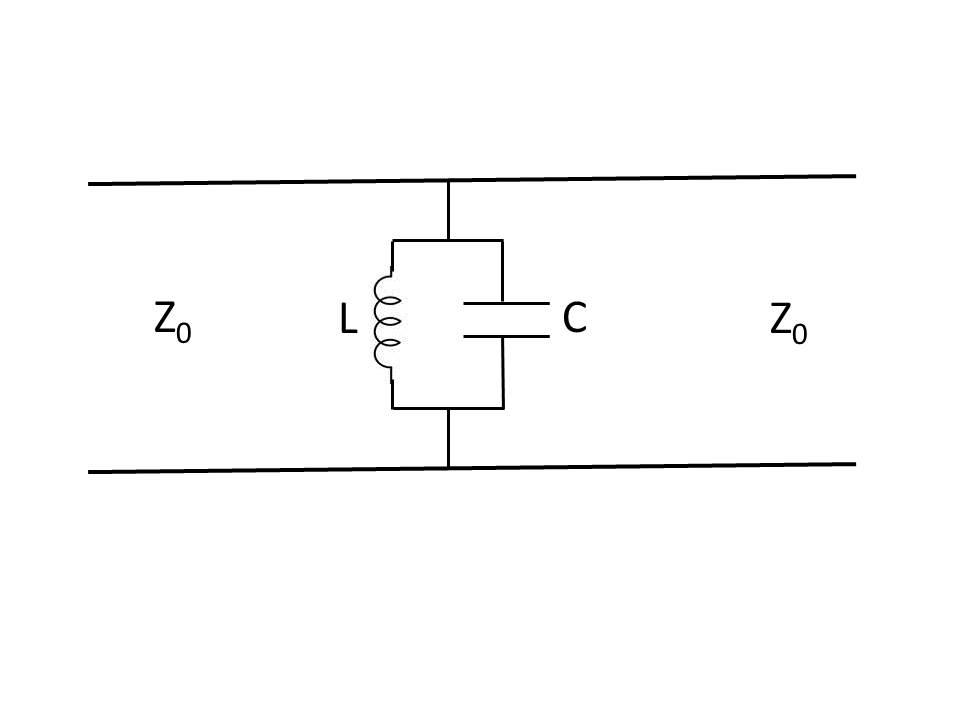
Equivalent circuit for mesh-type bandpass FSS

The equivalent circuit for a mesh-type bandpass FSS is shown in Fg. 2.4.2-1. The admittance of the parallel connection of inductor and capacitor is (Desoer, Kuh [1984]):
$$Y_\text{shunt} ~ = ~ \frac {1 - \omega^2 L C} {j \omega L}$$
and this admittance is zero (open-circuit condition) when
$$\omega_0^2 ~ = ~ \frac {1} {LC}$$

When the parallel combination of inductor and capacitor produces an open circuit, all energy is transmitted.

In the same way, the magnitude of the transmission coefficient of the bandpass filter is:
$$|T| = \frac{2 \omega L / Z_0} {\sqrt{4 \omega^2 L^2 / Z_0^2 ~ + ~ (1~-~\omega^2 L C)^2 } }$$

Below resonance, the admittance of the inductor, 1/jωL is greater than the admittance of the capacitor jωC, therefore the mesh-type bandpass FSS is inductive below resonance.

==== Comparison of equivalent circuit response and actual FSS response ====
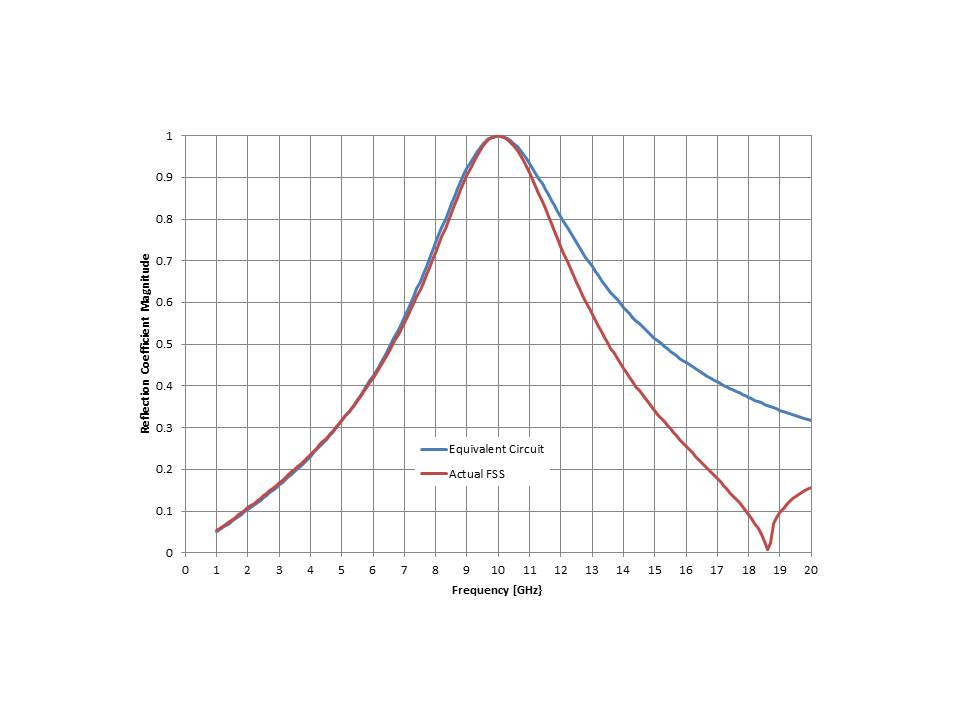
Equivalent Circuit Approximation to crossed-dipole bandstop FSS

Fig. 2.4.3-1 shows the comparison in reflection between a single-layer crossed dipole FSS and its fitted equivalent circuit. The equivalent circuit is a series connection of a capacitor and inductor placed in parallel across the transmission line, as in Fig. 2.4.1-2. This resonator produces a short circuit condition at resonance. The fit is very good below the resonance though not nearly as good above.

The real FSS has a reflection null at 18.7 GHz (the frequency at which the wavelength equals the unit cell dimension of .630"), which is not accounted for in the equivalent circuit model. The null is known as a Wood's anomaly and is caused by the inverse square root singularity in the spectral domain Green's function (3.1) going to infinity. Physically, this represents a uniform plane wave propagating in the plane of the FSS. In the spatial domain, the coherent summation of all of the spatial domain Green's function's becomes infinite, so that any finite current produces an infinite field on the surface of the FSS. As a result, all currents must be zero under this condition.

This example illustrates the usefulness and shortcomings of the simple equivalent circuit model. The equivalent circuit only includes features related to the individual scattering element, not features related to the periodic array, such as interactions between the scatterers.

==== FSS duality versus circuit duality ====
===== FSS duality =====
If a mesh type FSS is created from a patch type FSS in such a way that the metal portions or the former are replaced by aperture portions of the latter, then the two FSS are said to be duals of one another. Duality only strictly applies when no dielectric substrates are present, therefore it is only approximately satisfied in practice, though even when dielectric substrates are present, duality can be useful in FSS design. As a side note, Pathological FSS patterns such as a checkerboard FSS may be treated as the limit of the patch and mesh as the patch (and aperture) size approaches the unit cell size, with electrical connections of the mesh retained in the limit. For dual FSS, the reflection coefficient of the patch will be equal to the transmission coefficient of the mesh.

Circuit duality

The dual circuit of the bandstop filter can be obtained simply equating the reflection coefficient of the bandstop FSS to the transmission coefficient of the bandpass FSS to obtain (if we use L_{1}, C_{1} for the bandstop patch FSS and L_{2}, C_{2} for the bandpass mesh FSS):
$$L_2 ~ = ~C_1~ \frac {Z_0^2} {4}$$
$$C_2 ~ = ~L_1~ \frac {4} {Z_0^2}$$

This produces a bandpass circuit (with parameters L_{2}, C_{2}) which is the dual of the bandstop circuit (with parameters L_{1}, C_{1}).

== FSS equivalent circuits - applications to FSS design ==
Once the transmission line equivalent circuit has been determined, multi-layer FSS design becomes much simpler and more intuitive, like ordinary filter analysis and design. While it is certainly possible to design multi-layer FSS structures using first principles codes and generalized scattering matrices (GSM), it is far easier, quicker and more intuitive to use equivalent circuit models for FSS design, since it is possible to leverage decades' worth of research performed on electrical filter analysis and design and bring it to bear on FSS structures. FSS filters are also easier to design than waveguide filters, since the incidence angle does not vary with frequency.

=== Butterworth lowpass filter design using FSS equivalent circuits ===
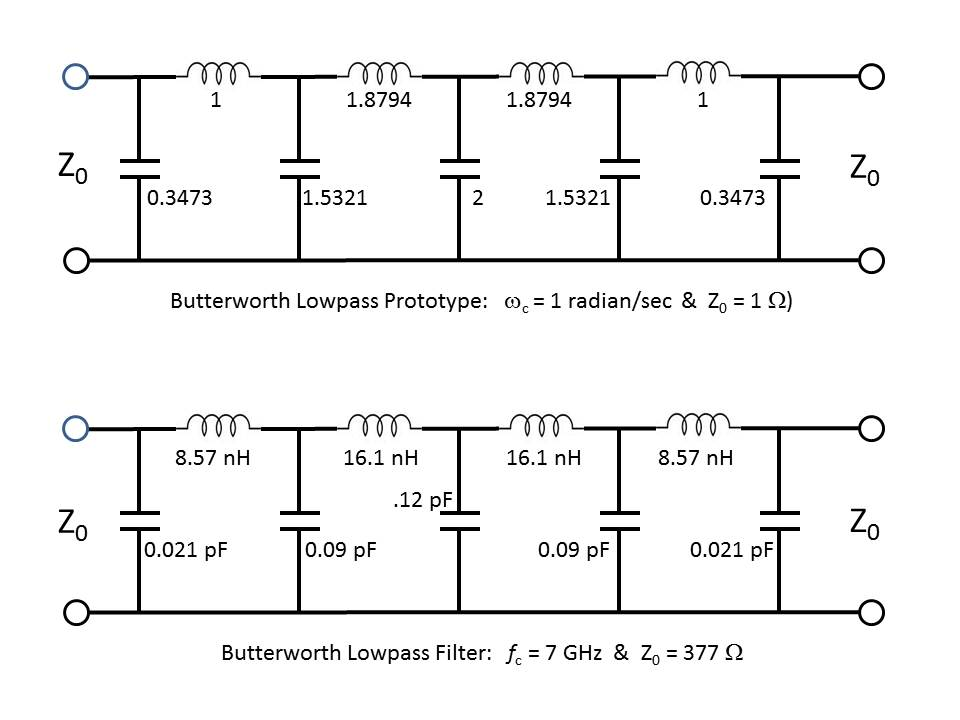
Butterworth Filter: Lowpass Prototype Ladder Network

==== Starting point: prototype lumped L, C Butterworth filter ====
As an example of how to use FSS equivalent circuits for quick and efficient design of a practical filter, we can sketch out the process that would be followed in designing a 5-stage Butterworth filter (Hunter [2001], Matthaei [1964]) using a stack of 5 frequency selective surfaces, with 4 air spacers in between the FSS sheets.

The lowpass prototype L,C ladder network is shown in Fig. 3.1.1-1 (Hunter [2001]). The cutoff frequency will be scaled to 7 GHz and the filter will be matched to 377 Ohms (the impedance of free space) on the input and output sides. The idea we'll follow is that the shunt capacitors will eventually be replaced by sub-resonant (capacitive) patch-type FSS sheets and the series inductors will be replaced by air spacers between the 5 FSS layers. Short transmission lines are approximately equivalent to series inductors.

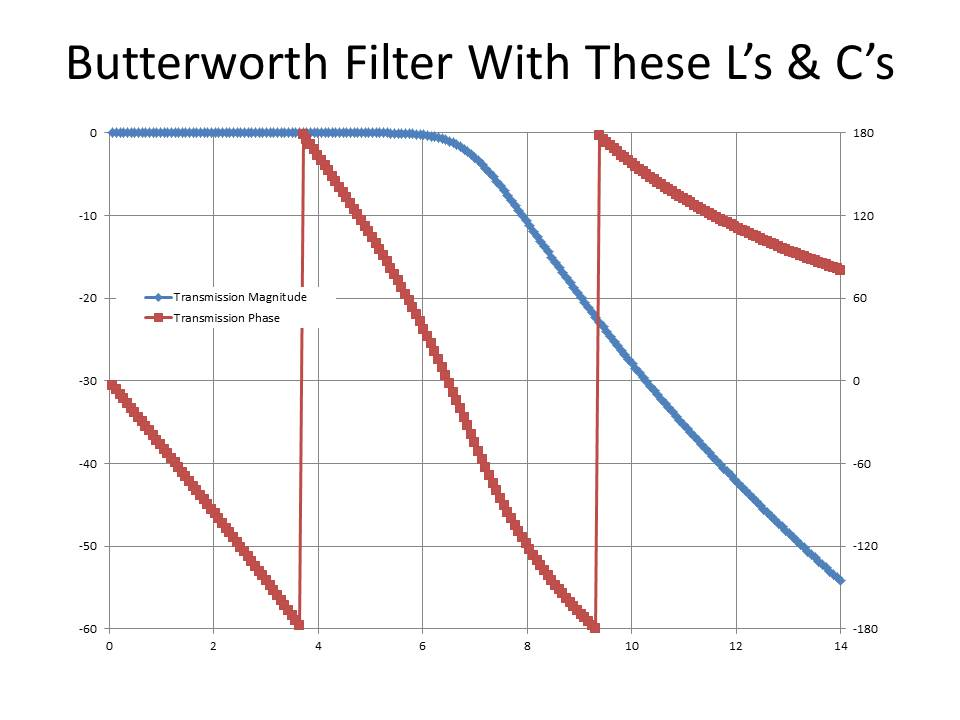
Transmission response of scaled butterworth filter.

==== Transmission response of prototype lumped L, C filter ====
The transmission magnitude and phase response of the scaled Butterworth L,C filter is shown in Fig. 3.1.2-1. Transmission magnitude is flat in the passband (below the 7 GHz cutoff frequency) and has a monotonically decreasing skirt on the high frequency side of the passband. The phase through the filter is linear throughout the 7 GHz passband, making this filter an ideal choice for a linear phase filter application, for example in the design of an ultra-wideband filter that approximates a true time delay transmission line. This is the baseline lumped L,C filter that will be the starting point for our 5-layer FSS Butterworth filter design.

Now we begin the process of transforming the prototype Butterworth lumped L,C filter into an equivalent FSS Butterworth filter. Two modifications of the baseline lumped L,C filter will be necessary, in order to obtain the corresponding FSS filter. First, the series inductors will be replaced by their equivalent transmission line sections, and then the shunt capacitors will be replaced by capacitive frequency selective surfaces.

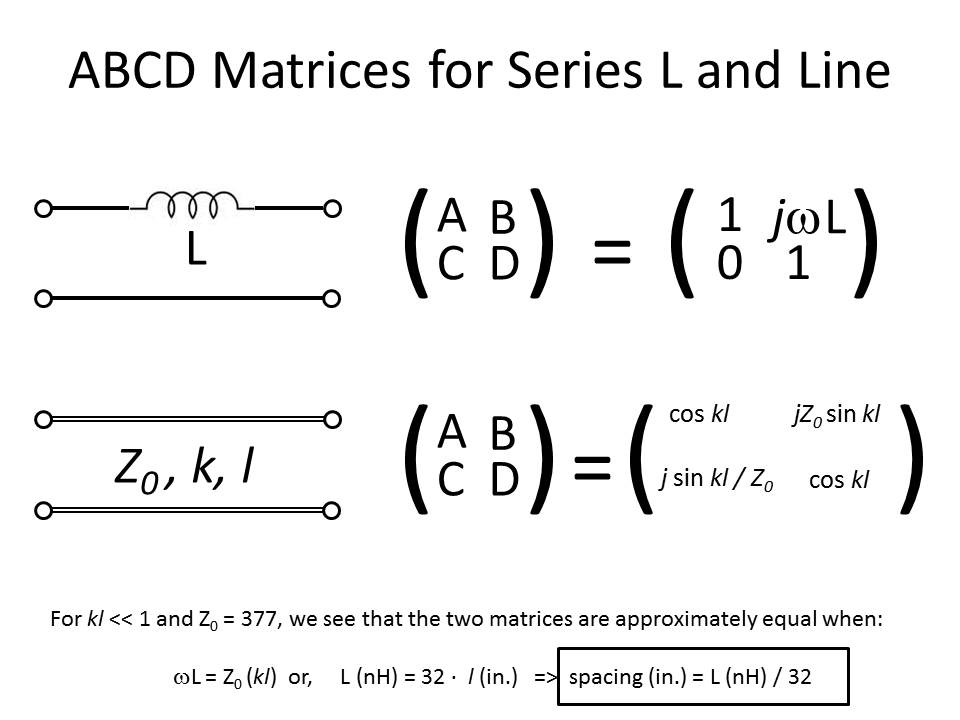
Spacers between capacitors (FSS layers).

==== First transformation: replace series inductors with transmission line spacers ====
At this point in the development, the series inductors in the prototype L,C ladder network will now be replaced by sub-half-wavelength air spacers (which we will model as transmission lines) between the FSS layers. The thickness of the air spacers may be determined as shown in Fig. 3.1.3-1, in which we compare the ABCD matrix of a series inductor with the ABCD matrix of a short transmission line (Ramo [1994]), in order to obtain the proper length of transmission line between the shunt capacitors (sub-resonant FSS layers) to produce a Butterworth filter response. It is well known that a series inductor represents an approximate lumped circuit model of a short transmission line, and we'll exploit this equivalence to determine the required thickness of the air spacers.

With the thickness of the air spacers between sheets now determined, the equivalent circuit now takes on the form shown in Fig. 3.1.4-1:

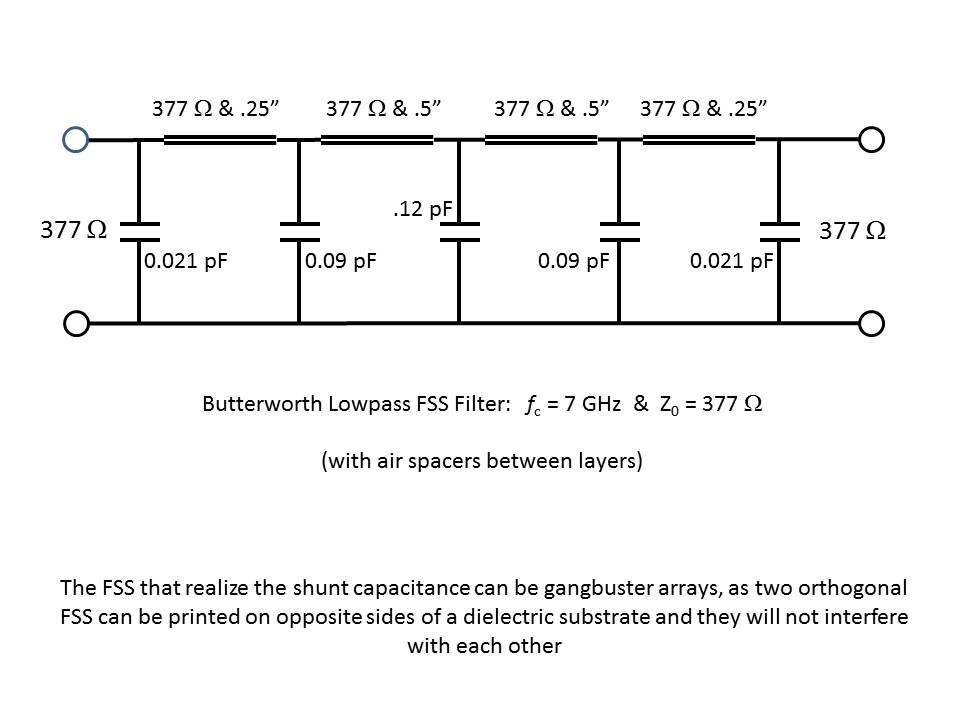
Butterworth transmission line filter.

==== Second transformation: Replace shunt capacitors with capacitive patch FSS below resonance ====
Now the only thing left to do is to find the lowpass FSS that yields the shunt capacitance values called out in Fig. 2.3.1-4. This is usually done through trial and error. Fitting a shunt capacitor to a real FSS is done by repeated running of a first principles code to match the reflection response of the shunt capacitor with the reflection from a capacitive FSS. Patch-type FSS below resonance will produce a capacitive shunt admittance equivalent circuit, with closer packing of elements in the FSS sheet yielding higher shunt capacitance values in the equivalent circuit.

== Fabrication ==
Typically FSSs are fabricated by chemically etching a copper-clad dielectric sheet, which may consist of Teflon (ε=2.1), Kapton, (ε=3.1), fiberglass (ε-4.5) or various forms of duroid (ε=6.0, 10.2). The sheet may range in thickness from a few thousandths of an inch to as much as 20–40 thousand.

== Applications ==
Applications of FSS range from the mundane (microwave ovens) to the forefront of contemporary technology involving active and reconfigurable structures such as smart skins.

=== Antennas ===
Radomes

EM absorbers

=== Camouflage ===
For multi-spectral camouflage, like the Saab Barracuda, FSS can be used to allow certain frequencies to penetrate, so communication and GPS isn't blocked.

== See also ==
- Fourier optics
- Photonic crystal
- Metamaterial
- Bragg diffraction
- Diffraction grating
- Bloch wave
