= Agostino Monorchio =

Italian electrical engineer

Agostino Monorchio is an electrical engineer at the University of Pisa, Italy. He was named a Fellow of the Institute of Electrical and Electronics Engineers (IEEE) in 2012 for his contributions to computational electromagnetics and for his work on frequency selective surfaces in metamaterials.
