= Optical filter =

Filters which selectively transmit specific colors

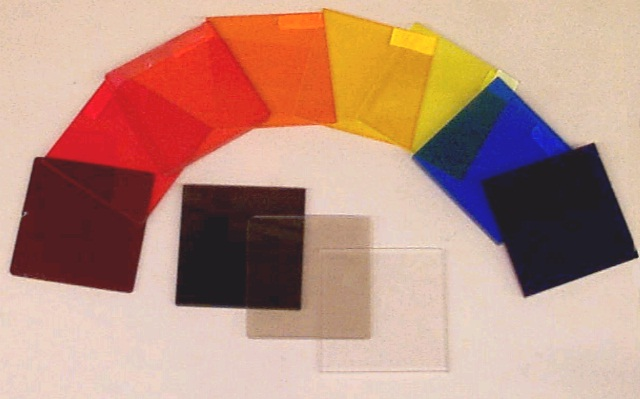
Coloured and neutral-density filters

An optical filter is a device that selectively transmits light of different wavelengths, usually implemented as a glass plane or plastic device in the optical path, which are either dyed in the bulk or have interference coatings. The optical properties of filters are completely described by their frequency response, which specifies how the magnitude and phase of each frequency component of an incoming signal is modified by the filter.

Filters mostly belong to one of two categories. The simplest, physically, is the absorptive filter; then there are interference or dichroic filters. Many optical filters are used for optical imaging and are manufactured to be transparent; some used for light sources can be translucent.

Optical filters selectively transmit light in a particular range of wavelengths, that is, colours, while absorbing the remainder. They can usually pass long wavelengths only (longpass), short wavelengths only (shortpass), or a band of wavelengths, blocking both longer and shorter wavelengths (bandpass). The passband may be narrower or wider; the transition or cutoff between maximal and minimal transmission can be sharp or gradual. There are filters with more complex transmission characteristic, for example with two peaks rather than a single band; these are more usually older designs traditionally used for photography; filters with more regular characteristics are used for scientific and technical work.

Optical filters are commonly used in photography (where some special effect filters are occasionally used as well as absorptive filters), in many optical instruments, and to colour stage lighting. In astronomy optical filters are used to restrict light passed to the spectral band of interest, e.g., to study infrared radiation without visible light which would affect film or sensors and overwhelm the desired infrared. Optical filters are also essential in fluorescence applications such as fluorescence microscopy and fluorescence spectroscopy.

Photographic filters are a particular case of optical filters, and much of the material here applies. Photographic filters do not need the accurately controlled optical properties and precisely defined transmission curves of filters designed for scientific work, and sell in larger quantities at correspondingly lower prices than many laboratory filters. Some photographic effect filters, such as star effect filters, are not relevant to scientific work.

== Measurement ==
In general, a given optical filter transmits a certain percentage of the incoming light as the wavelength changes. This is measured by a spectrophotometer. As a linear material, the absorption for each wavelength is independent of the presence of other wavelengths. A very few materials are non-linear, and the transmittance depends on the intensity and the combination of wavelengths of the incident light. Transparent fluorescent materials can work as an optical filter, with an absorption spectrum, and also as a light source, with an emission spectrum.

Also in general, light which is not transmitted is absorbed; for intense light, that can cause significant heating of the filter. However, the optical term absorbance refers to the attenuation of the incident light, regardless of the mechanism by which it is attenuated. Some filters, like mirrors, interference filters, or metal meshes, reflect or scatter much of the non-transmitted light.

The (dimensionless) Optical Density of a filter at a particular wavelength of light is defined as
$$-\log_{10} T$$
where T is the (dimensionless) transmittance of the filter at that wavelength.

== Absorptive ==
Optical filtering was first done with liquid-filled, glass-walled cells; they are still used for special purposes. The widest range of color-selection is now available as colored-film filters, originally made from animal gelatin but now usually a thermoplastic such as acetate, acrylic, polycarbonate, or polyester depending upon the application. They were standardized for photographic use by Wratten in the early 20th century, and also by color gel manufacturers for theater use.

There are now many absorptive filters made from glass to which various inorganic or organic compounds have been added. Colored glass optical filters, although harder to make to precise transmittance specifications, are more durable and stable once manufactured.

== Dichroic filter ==
Alternately, dichroic filters (also called "reflective" or "thin film" or "interference" filters) can be made by coating a glass substrate with a series of optical coatings. Dichroic filters usually reflect the unwanted portion of the light and transmit the remainder.

Dichroic filters use the principle of interference. Their layers form a sequential series of reflective cavities that resonate with the desired wavelengths. Other wavelengths destructively cancel or reflect as the peaks and troughs of the waves overlap.

Dichroic filters are particularly suited for precise scientific work, since their exact colour range can be controlled by the thickness and sequence of the coatings. They are usually much more expensive and delicate than absorption filters.

They can be used in devices such as the dichroic prism of a camera to separate a beam of light into different coloured components.

The basic scientific instrument of this type is a Fabry–Pérot interferometer. It uses two mirrors to establish a resonating cavity. It passes wavelengths that are a multiple of the cavity's resonance frequency.

Etalons are another variation: transparent cubes or fibers whose polished ends form mirrors tuned to resonate with specific wavelengths. These are often used to separate channels in telecommunications networks that use wavelength division multiplexing on long-haul optic fibers.

== Monochromatic ==
Monochromatic filters only allow a narrow range of wavelengths (essentially a single color) to pass.

== Infrared ==
The term "infrared filter" can be ambiguous, as it may be applied to filters to pass infrared (blocking other wavelengths) or to block infrared (only).

Infrared-passing filters are used to block visible light but pass infrared; they are used, for example, in infrared photography.

Infrared cut-off filters are designed to block or reflect infrared wavelengths but pass visible light. Mid-infrared filters are often used as heat-absorbing filters in devices with bright incandescent light bulbs (such as slide and overhead projectors) to prevent unwanted heating due to infrared radiation. There are also filters which are used in solid state video cameras to block IR due to the high sensitivity of many camera sensors to unwanted near-infrared light.

== Ultraviolet ==
Ultraviolet (UV) filters block ultraviolet radiation, but let visible light through. Because photographic film and digital sensors are sensitive to ultraviolet (which is abundant in skylight) but the human eye is not, such light would, if not filtered out, make photographs look different from the scene visible to people, for example making images of distant mountains appear unnaturally hazy. An ultraviolet-blocking filter renders images closer to the visual appearance of the scene.

As with infrared filters there is a potential ambiguity between UV-blocking and UV-passing filters; the latter are much less common, and more usually known explicitly as UV pass filters and UV bandpass filters.

== Neutral density ==
Neutral density (ND) filters have a constant attenuation across the range of visible wavelengths, and are used to reduce the intensity of light by reflecting or absorbing a portion of it. They are specified by the optical density (OD) of the filter, which is the negative of the common logarithm of the transmission coefficient. They are useful for making photographic exposures longer. A practical example is making a waterfall look blurry when it is photographed in bright light. Alternatively, the photographer might want to use a larger aperture (so as to limit the depth of field); adding an ND filter permits this. ND filters can be reflective (in which case they look like partially reflective mirrors) or absorptive (appearing grey or black).

== Longpass ==
A longpass (LP) filter is an optical interference or coloured glass filter that attenuates shorter wavelengths and transmits (passes) longer wavelengths over the active range of the target spectrum (ultraviolet, visible, or infrared). Longpass filters, which can have a very sharp slope (referred to as edge filters), are described by the cut-on wavelength at 50 percent of peak transmission. In fluorescence microscopy, longpass filters are frequently utilized in dichroic mirrors and barrier (emission) filters. Use of the older term "low-pass" to describe longpass filters has become uncommon; filters are usually described in terms of wavelength rather than frequency, and a "low-pass filter", without qualification, would be understood to be an electronic filter.

== Band-pass ==
Band-pass filters only transmit a certain wavelength band, and block others. The width of such a filter is expressed in the wavelength range it lets through and can be anything from much less than an Ångström to a few hundred nanometers. Such a filter can be made by combining an LP- and an SP filter.

Examples of band-pass filters are the Lyot filter and the Fabry–Pérot interferometer. Both of these filters can also be made tunable, such that the central wavelength can be chosen by the user. Band-pass filters are often used in astronomy when one wants to observe a certain process with specific associated spectral lines. The Dutch Open Telescope and Swedish Solar Telescope are examples where Lyot and Fabry–Pérot filters are being used.

== Shortpass ==
A shortpass (SP) Filter is an optical interference or coloured glass filter that attenuates longer wavelengths and transmits (passes) shorter wavelengths over the active range of the target spectrum (usually the ultraviolet and visible region). In fluorescence microscopy, shortpass filters are frequently employed in dichromatic mirrors and excitation filters.

== Guided-mode resonance filters ==
A relatively new class of filters introduced around 1990. These filters are normally filters in reflection, that is they are notch filters in transmission. They consist in their most basic form of a substrate waveguide and a subwavelength grating or 2D hole array. Such filters are normally transparent, but when a leaky guided mode of the waveguide is excited they become highly reflective (a record of over 99% experimentally) for a particular polarization, angular orientations, and wavelength range. The parameters of the filters are designed by proper choice of the grating parameters. The advantage of such filters are the few layers needed for ultra-narrow bandwidth filters (in contrast to dichroic filters), and the potential decoupling between spectral bandwidth and angular tolerance when more than 1 mode is excited.

== Metal mesh filters ==
Filters for sub-millimeter and near infrared wavelengths in astronomy are metal mesh grids that are stacked together to form LP, BP, and SP filters for these wavelengths.

== Polarizer ==
Another kind of optical filter is a polarizer or polarization filter, which blocks or transmits light according to its polarization. They are often made of materials such as Polaroid and are used for sunglasses and photography. Reflections, especially from water and wet road surfaces, are partially polarized, and polarized sunglasses will block some of this reflected light, allowing an angler to better view below the surface of the water and better vision for a driver. Light from a clear blue sky is also polarized, and adjustable filters are used in colour photography to darken the appearance of the sky without introducing colours to other objects, and in both colour and black-and-white photography to control specular reflections from objects and water. Much older than g.m.r.f (just above) these first (and some still) use fine mesh integrated in the lens.

Polarized filters are also used to view certain types of stereograms, so that each eye will see a distinct image from a single source.

== Arc welding ==
An arc source puts out visible, infrared and ultraviolet light that may be harmful to human eyes. Therefore, optical filters on welding helmets must meet ANSI Z87:1 (a safety glasses specification) in order to protect human vision.

Some examples of filters that would provide this kind of filtering would be earth elements embedded or coated on glass, but practically speaking it is not possible to do perfect filtering. A perfect filter would remove particular wavelengths and leave plenty of light so a worker can see what he/she is working on.

== Wedge filter ==
A wedge filter is an optical filter so constructed that its thickness varies continuously or in steps in the shape of a wedge. The filter is used to modify the intensity distribution in a radiation beam. It is also known as linearly variable filter (LVF). It is used in various optical sensors where wavelength separation is required e.g. in hyperspectral sensors.

== See also ==
- Anti-aliasing filter
- Astronomical filter
- Atomic line filter
- Dichroic prism
- Filter (signal processing)
- Filter fluorometer
- Lyot filter
- Photographic filter
- Photometric system
- Rugate filter
- Warm filter
