= Warm filter =

Type of photographic filter

A warm filter is a photographic filter that improves the color of all skin tones and absorbs blue cast often caused by electronic flash or outdoor shade. They add warmth to pale, washed-out flesh tones and are ideal for portraits as they smooth facial details while adding warmth to skin tones (for color imaging).

In general, they suppress blue casts on overcast days and on subjects lit by blue sky.

== See also ==
- Filter factor
- Infrared filter
- Neutral-density filter
- Polarizer
- UV filter
