= Street mirrors =

Mirrors outside windows to allow wider angular views

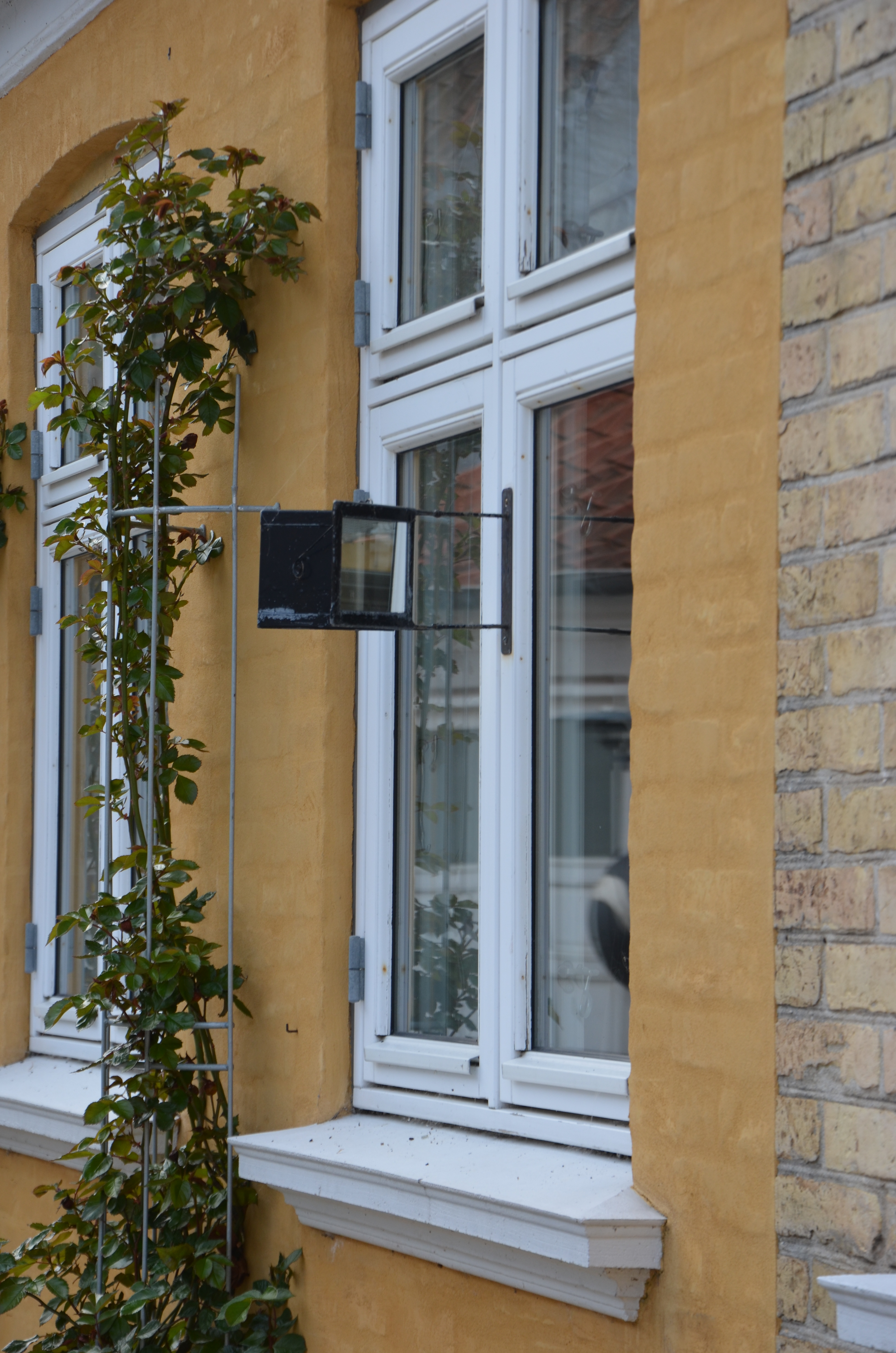
In Marstal, Denmark

Street mirrors, busybody mirrors, or gossip mirrors were foldable mirrors attached on the outside of windows that allowed people indoors to discreetly be able look outside and to the sides of windows. These allowed one to see who was at the door or on the street below. These were predominantly used in Finland ("Juorupeili" or "katupeili"), Denmark ("Gadespejl") and Sweden ("Skvallerspegel") in the 18th and early 19th century.

Historians suggest that the introduction of these mirrors rose due to increased international mobility into coastal towns during the period and the resulting insecurity felt in urban areas. They also came into use in the United States in places like Philadelphia where they were called "busybody mirrors" or just "busybodies". They have sometimes been claimed to have been introduced by Benjamin Franklin. They were considered old-fashioned by the 1920s.
