= Nomarski prism =

Type of polarizer

Schematic illustration of a Nomarski prism. Unpolarized light enters on the left, and the two polarizations (ordinary and extraordinary polarization) are separated. The prism itself consists of two birefringent crystals, glued together with an adhesive such as Canada balsam. The length scale of the prism is exaggerated (it is usually a thin plate, looking like a piece of glass), whereas the point of beams should be matched to the focal plane of the matching objective.

A Nomarski prism is a modification of the Wollaston prism that is used in differential interference contrast microscopy. It is named after its inventor, Polish and naturalized-French physicist Georges Nomarski. Like the Wollaston prism, the Nomarski prism consists of two birefringent crystal wedges (e.g. quartz or calcite) cemented together at the hypotenuse (e.g. with Canada balsam). One of the wedges is identical to a conventional Wollaston wedge and has the optic axis oriented parallel to the surface of the prism. The second wedge of the prism is modified by cutting the crystal so that the optic axis is oriented obliquely with respect to the flat surface of the prism. The Nomarski modification causes the light rays to come to a focal point outside the body of the prism, and allows greater flexibility so that when setting up the microscope the prism can be actively focused.

== See also ==
- Glan–Foucault prism
- Glan–Thompson prism
- Nicol prism
- Prism (optics)
- Rochon prism
- Sénarmont prism
