= Glan prism =

Glan prism or Glan polarizer may refer to:

- Glan–Thompson prism, a polarizer made from cemented calcite prisms
- Glan–Foucault prism, a polarizer made from air-spaced calcite prisms
- Glan–Taylor prism, an improved air-spaced calcite polarizer design
  - Glan–laser prism, a high-power Glan–Taylor prism
