= Prism (optics) =

Transparent optical element with flat, polished surfaces that refract light

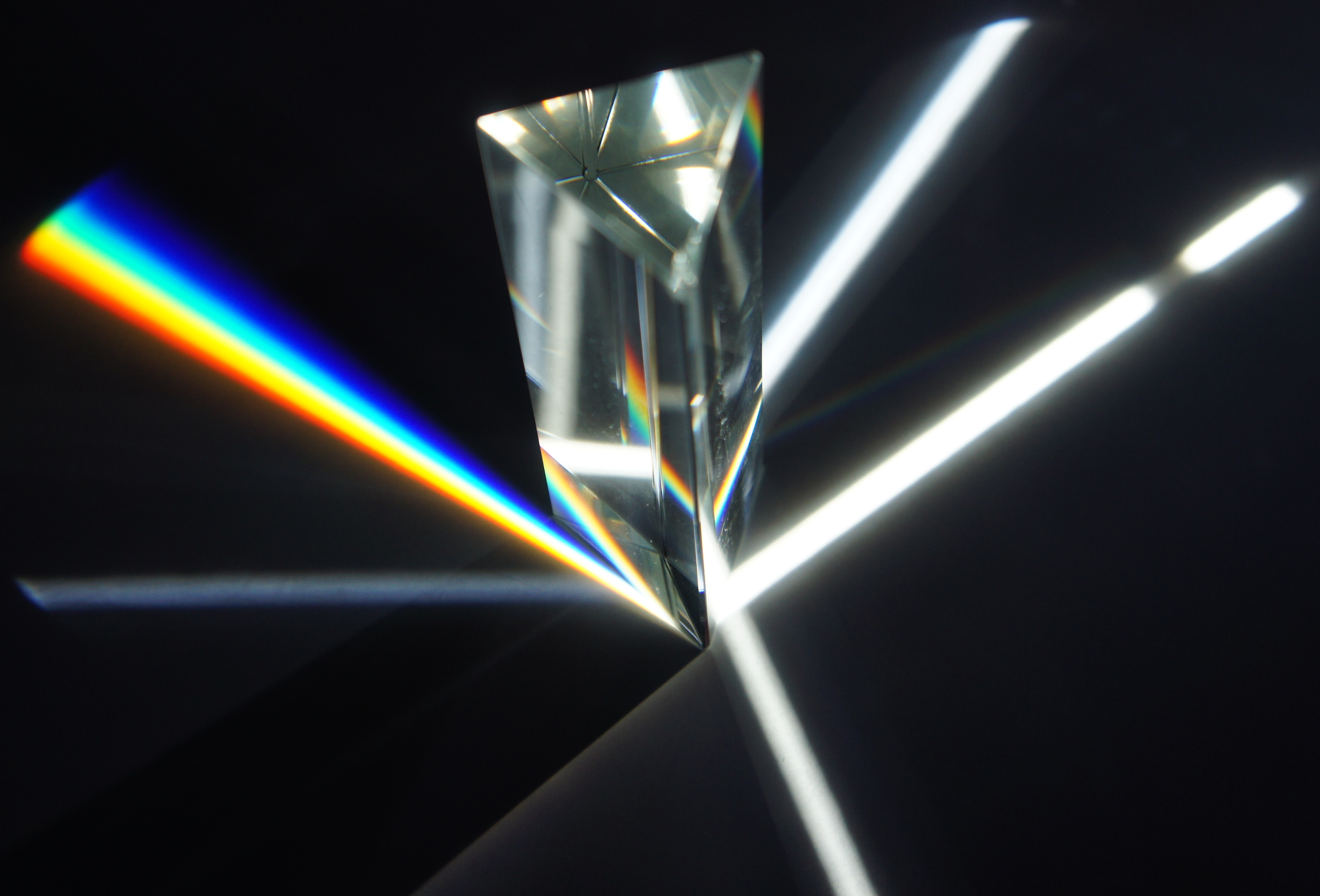
A familiar dispersive prism

An optical prism is a transparent optical element with flat, polished surfaces that are designed to refract light. At least one surface must be angled—elements with only two parallel surfaces are windows, not prisms. The most familiar type of optical prism is the triangular prism, which has a triangular base and rectangular sides. Not all optical prisms are geometric prisms, and not all geometric prisms would count as an optical prism. Prisms can be made from any material that is transparent to the wavelengths for which they are designed. Typical materials include glass, acrylic and fluorite.

A dispersive prism can be used to break white light up into its constituent spectral colors (the colors of the rainbow) to form a spectrum as described in the following section. Other types of prisms noted below can be used to reflect light, or to split light into components with different polarizations.

== Types ==
=== Dispersive ===
Comparison of the spectra obtained from a diffraction grating by diffraction (1), and a prism by refraction (2). Longer wavelengths (red) are diffracted more, but refracted less than shorter wavelengths (violet).

Dispersive prisms are used to break up light into its constituent spectral colors because the refractive index depends on wavelength; the white light entering the prism is a mixture of different wavelengths, each of which gets bent slightly differently. Blue light is slowed more than red light and will therefore be bent more than red light.

- Abbe prism
- Amici prism and other types of compound prisms
- Féry prism
- Grism, a dispersive prism with a diffraction grating on its surface
- Littrow prism with mirror on its rear facet
- Pellin–Broca prism
- Triangular prism

Spectral dispersion is the best known property of optical prisms, although not the most frequent purpose of using optical prisms in practice.

=== Reflective ===
Reflective prisms are used to reflect light, in order to flip, invert, rotate, deviate or displace the light beam. They are typically used to erect the image in binoculars or single-lens reflex cameras – without the prisms the image would be upside down for the user.

Reflective prisms use total internal reflection to achieve near-perfect reflection of light that strikes the facets at a sufficiently oblique angle. Prisms are usually made of optical glass which, combined with anti-reflective coating of input and output facets, leads to significantly lower light loss than metallic mirrors.

- Odd number of reflections, image projects as flipped (mirrored)
  - triangular prism reflector, projects image sideways (chromatic dispersion is zero in case of perpendicular input and output incidence)
  - Roof pentaprism projects image sideways flipped along the other axis
  - Dove prism projects image forward
  - Corner-cube retroreflector projects image backwards
- Even number of reflections, image projects upright (without change in handedness; may or may not be rotated)
  - Porro prism projects image backwards and displaced
  - Porro–Abbe prism projects image forward, rotated by 180° and displaced
  - Perger prism a development based on the Porro–Abbe prism, projects image forward, rotated by 180° and displaced
  - Abbe–Koenig prism projects image forward, rotated by 180° and collinear (4 internal reflections [2 reflections are on roof plains])
  - Bauernfeind prism projects image sideways (inclined by 45°)
  - Amici roof prism projects image sideways
  - Pentaprism projects image sideways
  - Schmidt–Pechan prism projects image forward, rotated by 180° (6 reflections [2 reflections are on roof plains]; composed of Bauernfeind part and Schmidt part)
  - Uppendahl prism projects image forward, rotated by 180° and collinear (6 reflections [2 reflections are on roof plains]); composed of 3 prisms cemented together)

=== Beam-splitting ===
Various thin-film optical layers can be deposited on the hypotenuse of one right-angled prism, and cemented to another prism to form a beam-splitter cube. Overall optical performance of such a cube is determined by the thin layer.

In comparison with a usual glass substrate, the glass cube provides protection of the thin-film layer from both sides and better mechanical stability. The cube can also eliminate etalon effects, back-side reflection and slight beam deflection.

- dichroic color filters form a dichroic prism
- Polarizing cube beamsplitters have lower extinction ratio than birefringent ones, but less expensive
- Partially-metallized mirrors provide non-polarizing beamsplitters
- Air gap − When hypotenuses of two triangular prisms are stacked very close to each other with air gap, frustrated total internal reflection in one prism makes it possible to couple part of the radiation into a propagating wave in the second prism. The transmitted power drops exponentially with the gap width, so it can be tuned over many orders of magnitude by a micrometric screw.
- Biprism (or Fresnel biprism): two prisms joined at their bases, forming a wide vertex angle (~ 180°); used in common-path interferometry.

=== Polarizing ===
Another class is formed by polarizing prisms which use birefringence to split a beam of light into components of varying polarization. In the visible and UV regions, they have very low losses and their extinction ratio typically exceeds $10^5:1$, which is superior to other types of polarizers. They may or may not employ total internal reflection;

- One polarization is separated by total internal reflection:
  - Nicol prism
  - Glan–Foucault prism
  - Glan–Taylor prism, a high-power variant of which is also denoted as Glan–laser prism
  - Glan–Thompson prism
- One polarization is deviated by different refraction only:
  - Rochon prism
  - Sénarmont prism
- Both polarizations are deviated by refraction:
  - Wollaston prism
  - Nomarski prism – a variant of the Wollaston prism where p- and s-components emerge displaced and converging towards each other; important for differential interference contrast microscopy
- Both polarizations stay parallel, but are spatially separated:
  - polarisation beam displacers, typically made of thick anisotropic crystal with plan-parallel facets

These are typically made of a birefringent crystalline material like calcite, but other materials like quartz and α-BBO may be necessary for UV applications, and others (MgF_{2}, YVO_{4} and TiO_{2}) will extend transmission farther into the infrared spectral range.

Prisms made of isotropic materials like glass will also alter polarization of light, as partial reflection under oblique angles does not maintain the amplitude ratio (nor phase) of the s- and p-polarized components of the light, leading to general elliptical polarization. This is generally an unwanted effect of dispersive prisms. In some cases this can be avoided by choosing prism geometry which light enters and exits under perpendicular angle, by compensation through non-planar light trajectory, or by use of p-polarized light.

Total internal reflection alters only the mutual phase between s- and p-polarized light. Under well chosen angle of incidence, this phase is close to $\pi/4$.

- Fresnel rhomb uses this effect to achieve conversion between circular and linear polarisation. This phase difference is not explicitly dependent on wavelength, but only on refractive index, so Fresnel rhombs made of low-dispersion glasses achieve much broader spectral range than quarter-wave plates. They displace the beam, however.
- Doubled Fresnel rhomb, with quadruple reflection and zero beam displacement, substitutes a half-wave plate.
- Similar effect can also be used to make a polarization-maintaining optics.

==== Depolarizers ====
Birefringent crystals can be assembled in a way that leads to apparent depolarization of the light.

- Cornu depolarizer
- Lyot depolarizer

Depolarization would not be observed for an ideal monochromatic plane wave, as actually both devices turn reduced temporal coherence or spatial coherence, respectively, of the beam into decoherence of its polarization components.

== Other uses ==
Total internal reflection in prisms finds numerous uses through optics, plasmonics and microscopy. In particular:

- Prisms are used to couple propagating light to surface plasmons. Either the hypotenuse of a triangular prism is metallized (Kretschmann configuration), or evanescent wave is coupled to very close metallic surface (Otto configuration).
- Some laser active media can be formed as a prism where the low-quality pump beam enters the front facet, while the amplified beam undergoes total internal reflection under grazing incidence from it. Such a design suffers less from thermal stress and is easy to be pumped by high-power laser diodes.

Other uses of prisms are based on their beam-deviating refraction:

- Wedge prisms are used to deflect a beam of monochromatic light by a fixed angle. A pair of such prisms can be used for beam steering; by rotating the prisms the beam can be deflected into any desired angle within a conical "field of regard". The most commonly found implementation is a Risley prism pair.
- Transparent windows of, e.g., vacuum chambers or cuvettes can also be slightly wedged (10' − 1°). While this does not reduce reflection, it suppresses Fabry-Pérot interferences that would otherwise modulate their transmission spectrum.
- Anamorphic pair of similar, but asymmetrically placed prisms can also change the profile of a beam. This is often used to make a round beam from the elliptical output of a laser diode. With its monochromatic light, slight chromatic dispersion arising from different wedge inclination is not a problem.
- Deck prisms were used on sailing ships to bring daylight below deck, since candles and kerosene lamps are a fire hazard on wooden ships.

== In optometry ==
By shifting corrective lenses off axis, images seen through them can be displaced in the same way that a prism displaces images. Eye care professionals use prisms, as well as lenses off axis, to treat various orthoptics problems:

- Diplopia (double vision)
- Positive and negative fusion problems

Prism spectacles with a single prism perform a relative displacement of the two eyes, thereby correcting eso-, exo, hyper- or hypotropia.

In contrast, spectacles with prisms of equal power for both eyes, called yoked prisms (also: conjugate prisms, ambient lenses or performance glasses) shift the visual field of both eyes to the same extent.

== See also ==
- Eyeglass prescription
- Minimum deviation
- Multiple-prism dispersion theory
- Prism (geometry)
- Prism compressor
- Prism dioptre
- Prism lighting
- Prism spectrometer
- Theory of Colours
- Triangular prism (geometry)
- Superprism
