= Hureau de Sénarmont =

Hureau de Sénarmont is a surname. Notable people with the surname include:

- Alexandre-Antoine Hureau de Sénarmont (1769–1810), French general
- Henri Hureau de Sénarmont (1808–1862), French mineralogist
