= Differential interference contrast microscopy =

Optical microscopy technique

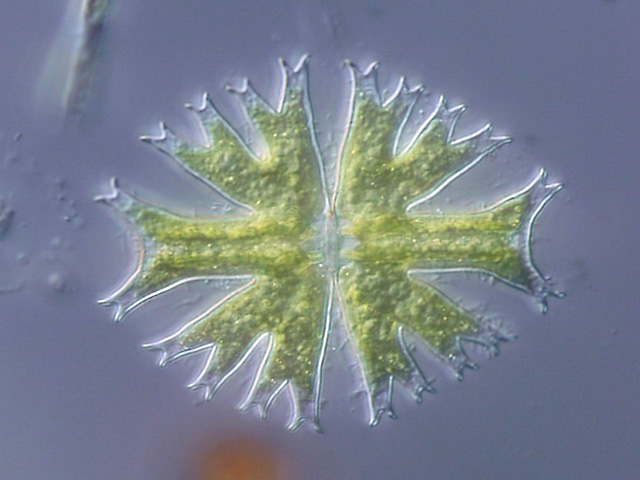
Micrasterias furcata imaged in transmitted DIC microscopy

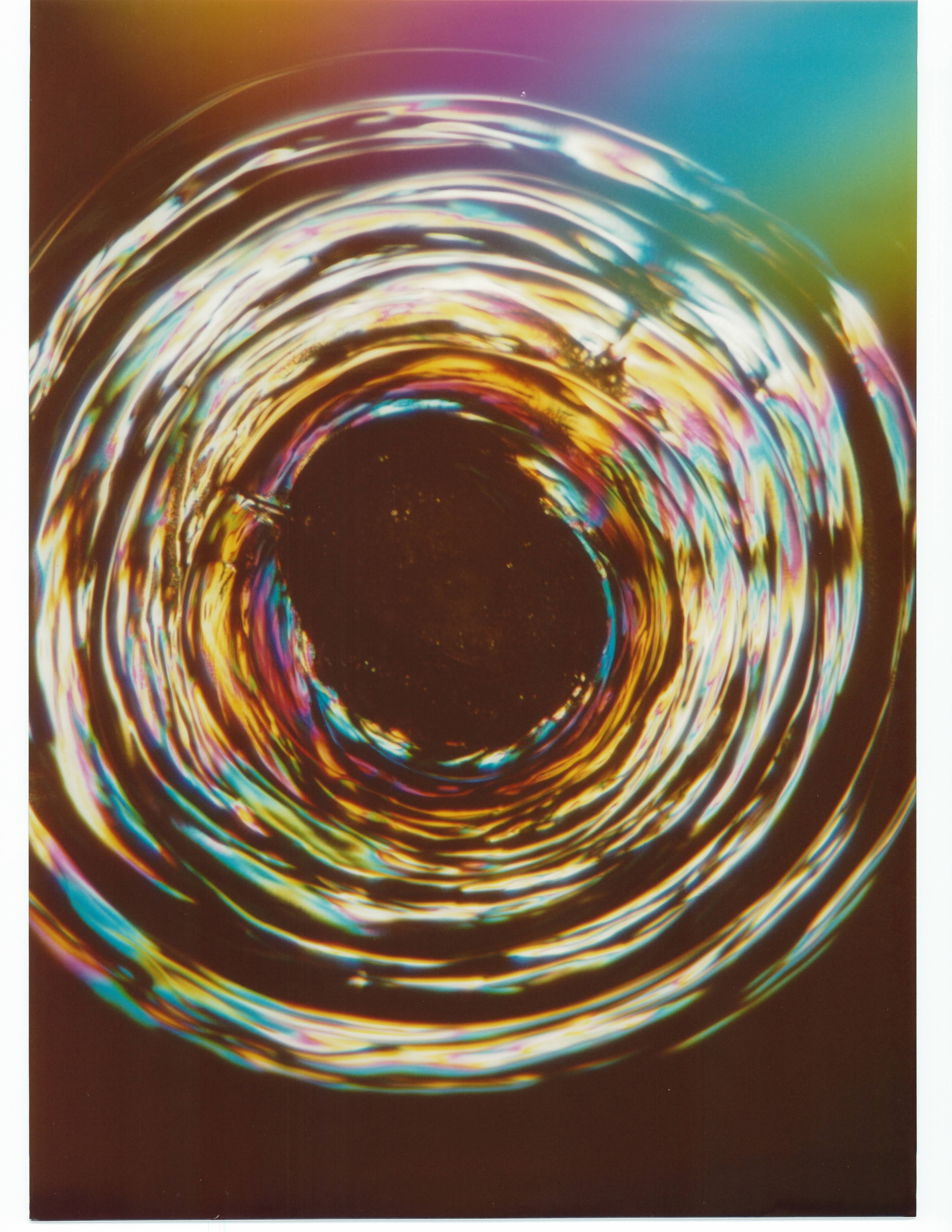
Laser-induced optical damage in LiNbO_{3} under 150× Nomarski microscopy

Differential interference contrast (DIC) microscopy, also called Nomarski interference contrast (NIC) or Nomarski microscopy, is an optical microscopy technique used to enhance the contrast in unstained, transparent samples. DIC works on the principle of interferometry to gain information about the optical path length of the sample, to see otherwise invisible features. A relatively complex optical system produces an image with the object appearing black to white on a grey background. This image is similar to that obtained by phase-contrast microscopy, but without the bright diffraction halo. The technique was invented by Francis Hughes Smith. The "Smith DIK" was produced by Ernst Leitz Wetzlar in Germany and was difficult to manufacture. DIC was then developed further by Polish physicist Georges Nomarski in 1952.

DIC works by separating a polarized light source into two orthogonally polarized mutually coherent parts which are spatially displaced (sheared) at the sample plane, and recombined before observation. The interference of the two parts at recombination is sensitive to their optical path difference (i.e. the product of refractive index and geometric path length). Adding an adjustable offset phase determining the interference at zero optical path difference in the sample, the contrast is proportional to the path length gradient along the shear direction, giving the appearance of a three-dimensional physical relief corresponding to the variation of optical density of the sample, emphasising lines and edges though not providing a topographically accurate image.

== The light path ==
1. Unpolarised light enters the microscope and is polarised at 45°.

Polarised light is required for the technique to work.

2. The polarised light enters the first Nomarski-modified Wollaston prism and is separated into two rays polarised at 90° to each other, the sampling and reference rays.

Wollaston prisms are a type of prism made of two layers of a crystalline substance, such as quartz, which, due to the variation of refractive index depending on the polarisation of the light, splits the light according to its polarisation. The Nomarski prism causes the two rays to come to a focal point outside the body of the prism, and so allows greater flexibility when setting up the microscope, as the prism can be actively focused.

3. The two rays are focused by the condenser for passage through the sample. These two rays are focused so they will pass through two adjacent points in the sample, around 0.2 μm apart.

The sample is effectively illuminated by two coherent light sources, one with 0° polarisation and the other with 90° polarisation. These two illuminations are, however, not quite aligned, with one lying slightly offset with respect to the other.

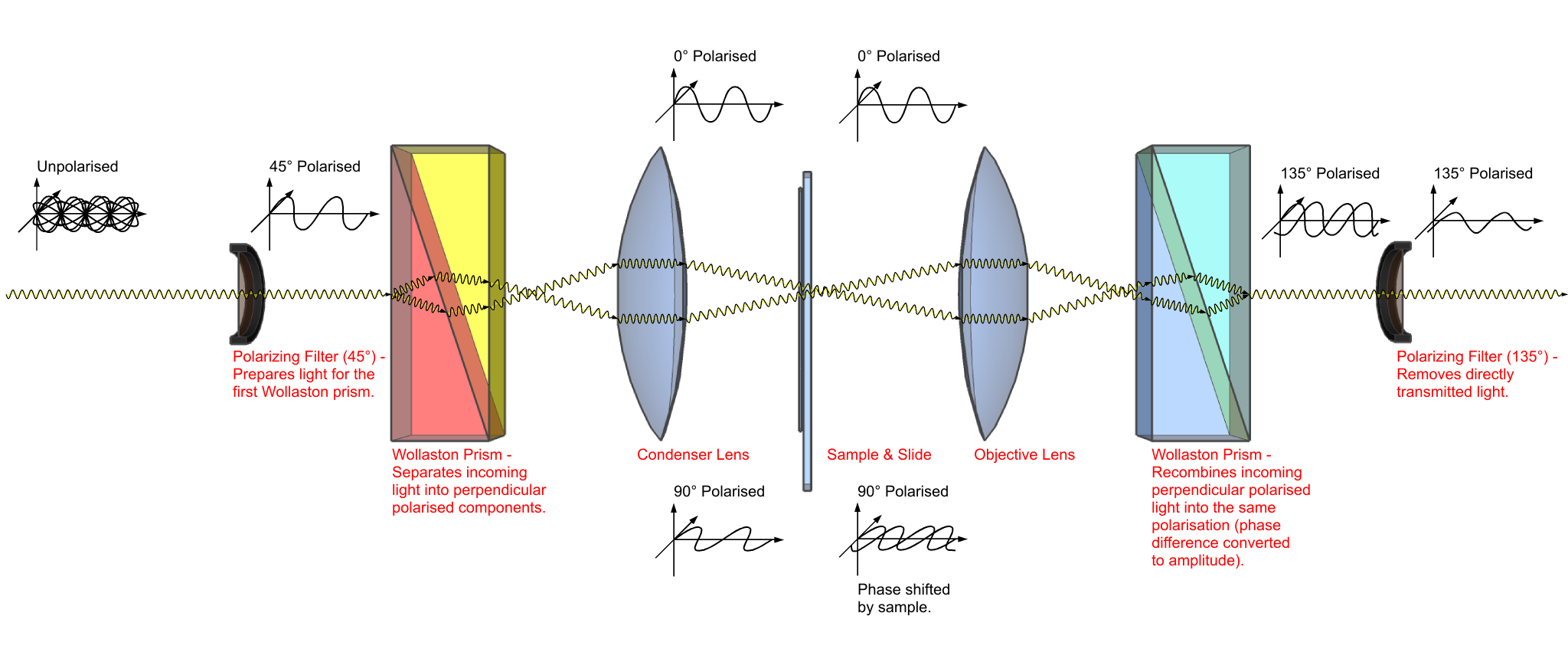
The route of light through a DIC microscope. The two light beams should be parallel between condenser and objective

4. The rays travel through adjacent areas of the sample, separated by the shear. The separation is normally similar to the resolution of the microscope. They will experience different optical path lengths where the areas differ in refractive index or thickness. This causes a change in phase of one ray relative to the other due to the delay experienced by the wave in the more optically dense material.

The passage of many pairs of rays through pairs of adjacent points in the sample (and their absorbance, refraction and scattering by the sample) means an image of the sample will now be carried by both the 0° and 90° polarised light. These, if looked at individually, would be bright field images of the sample, slightly offset from each other. The light also carries information about the image invisible to the human eye, the phase of the light. This is vital later. The different polarisations prevent interference between these two images at this point.

5. The rays travel through the objective lens and are focused for the second Nomarski-modified Wollaston prism.

6. The second prism recombines the two rays into one polarised at 135°. The combination of the rays leads to interference, brightening or darkening the image at that point according to the optical path difference.

This prism overlays the two bright field images and aligns their polarisations so they can interfere. However, the images do not quite line up because of the offset in illumination – this means that instead of interference occurring between 2 rays of light that passed through the same point in the specimen, interference occurs between rays of light that went through adjacent points which therefore have a slightly different phase. Because the difference in phase is due to the difference in optical path length, this recombination of light causes "optical differentiation" of the optical path length, generating the image seen.

== Image ==
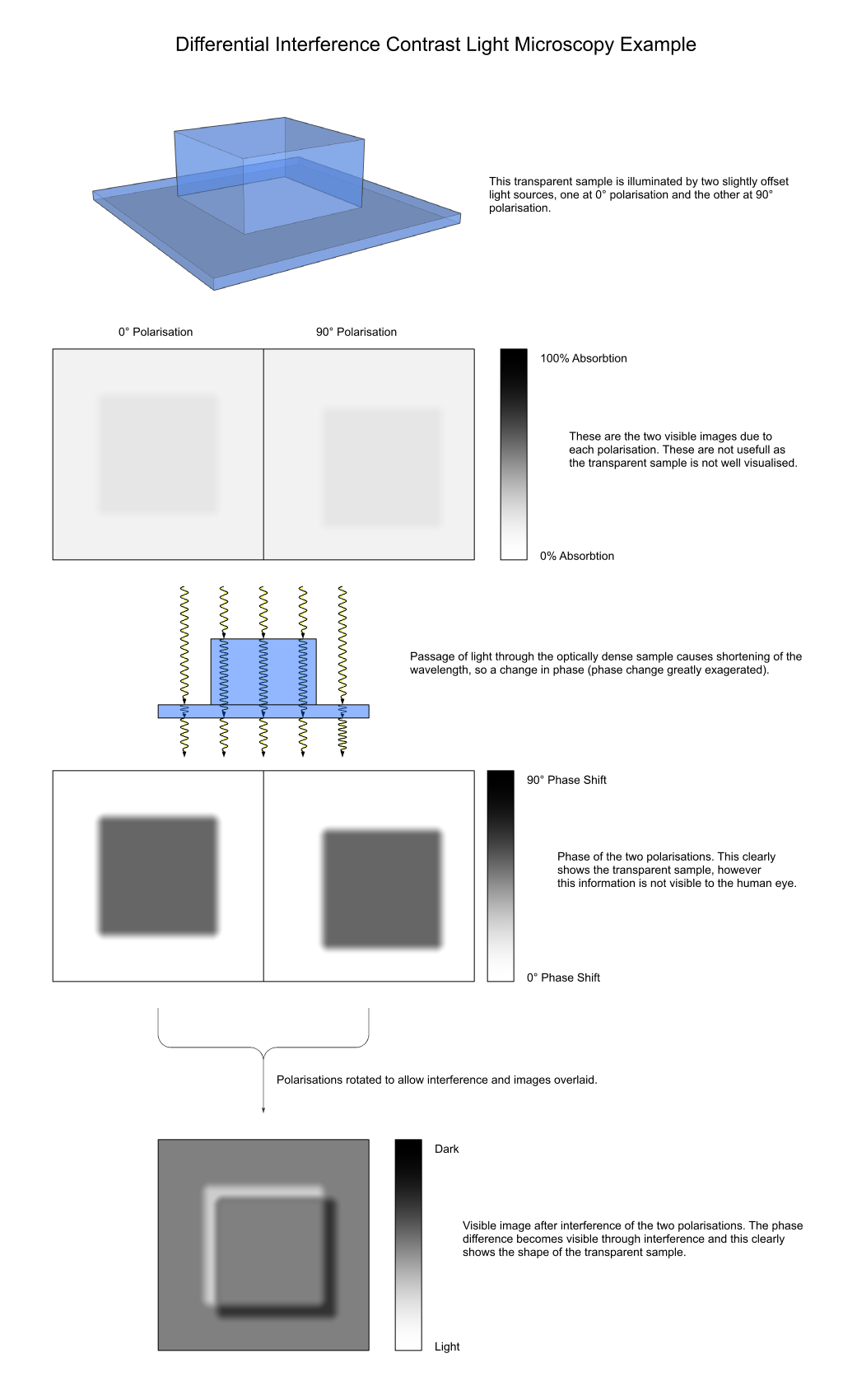
The process of image production in a DIC microscope

The image has the appearance of a three-dimensional object under very oblique illumination, causing strong light and dark shadows on the corresponding faces. The direction of apparent illumination is defined by the orientation of the Wollaston prisms.

As explained above, the image is generated from two identical bright field images being overlaid slightly offset from each other (typically around 0.2 μm), and the subsequent interference due to phase difference converting changes in phase (and so optical path length) to a visible change in darkness. This interference may be either constructive or destructive, giving rise to the characteristic appearance of three dimensions.

The typical phase difference giving rise to the interference is very small, very rarely being larger than 90° (a quarter of the wavelength). This is due to the similarity of refractive index of most samples and the media they are in: for example, a cell in water only has a refractive index difference of around 0.05. This small phase difference is important for the correct function of DIC, since if the phase difference at the joint between two substances is too large then the phase difference could reach 180° (half a wavelength), resulting in complete destructive interference and an anomalous dark region; if the phase difference reached 360° (a full wavelength), it would produce complete constructive interference, creating an anomalous bright region.

The image can be approximated (neglecting refraction and absorption due to the sample and the resolution limit of beam separation) as the differential of optical path length with respect to position across the sample along the shear, and so the differential of the refractive index (optical density) of the sample.

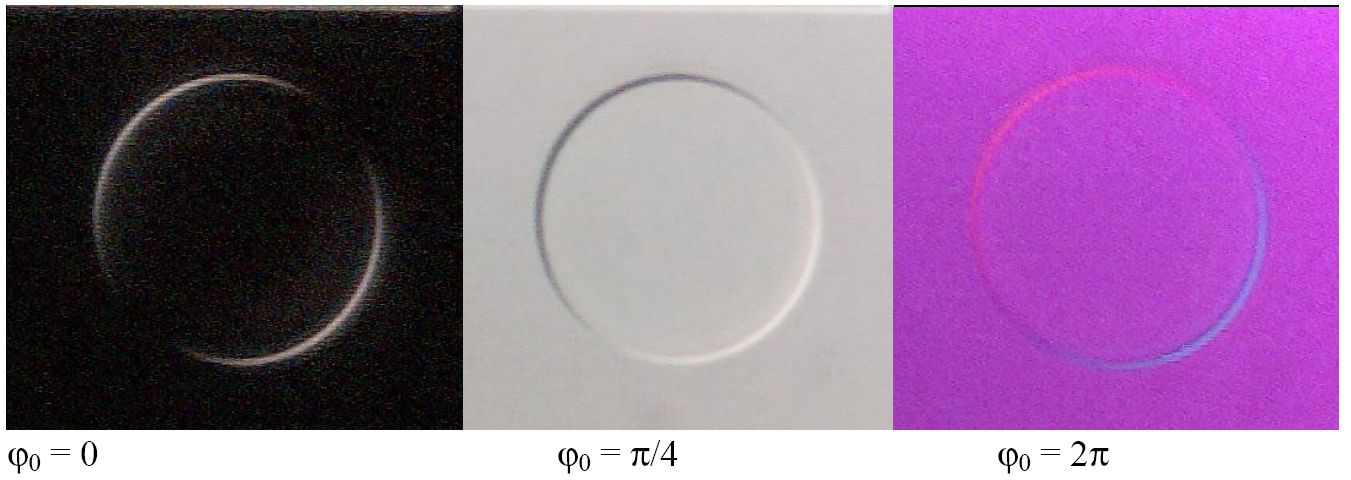
DIC images with different offset phases φ_{0}

The contrast can be adjusted using the offset phase, either by translating the objective Nomarski prism, or by a lambda/4 waveplate between polarizer and the condenser Normarski prism (De-Senarmont Compensation). The resulting contrast is going from dark-field for zero phase offset (intensity proportional to the square of the shear differential), to the typical relief seen for phase of ~5–90 degrees, to optical staining at 360 degrees, where the extinguished wavelength shifts with the phase differential.

When sequentially shifted images are collated, the phase-shift introduced by the object can be decoupled from unwanted non-interferometric artifacts, which typically results in an improvement in contrast, especially in turbid samples.

== Applications ==
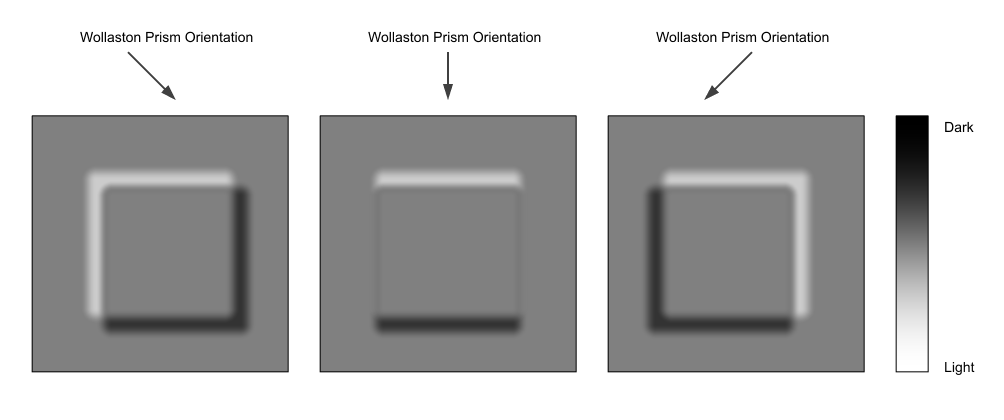
Orientation-specific imaging of a transparent cuboid in DIC

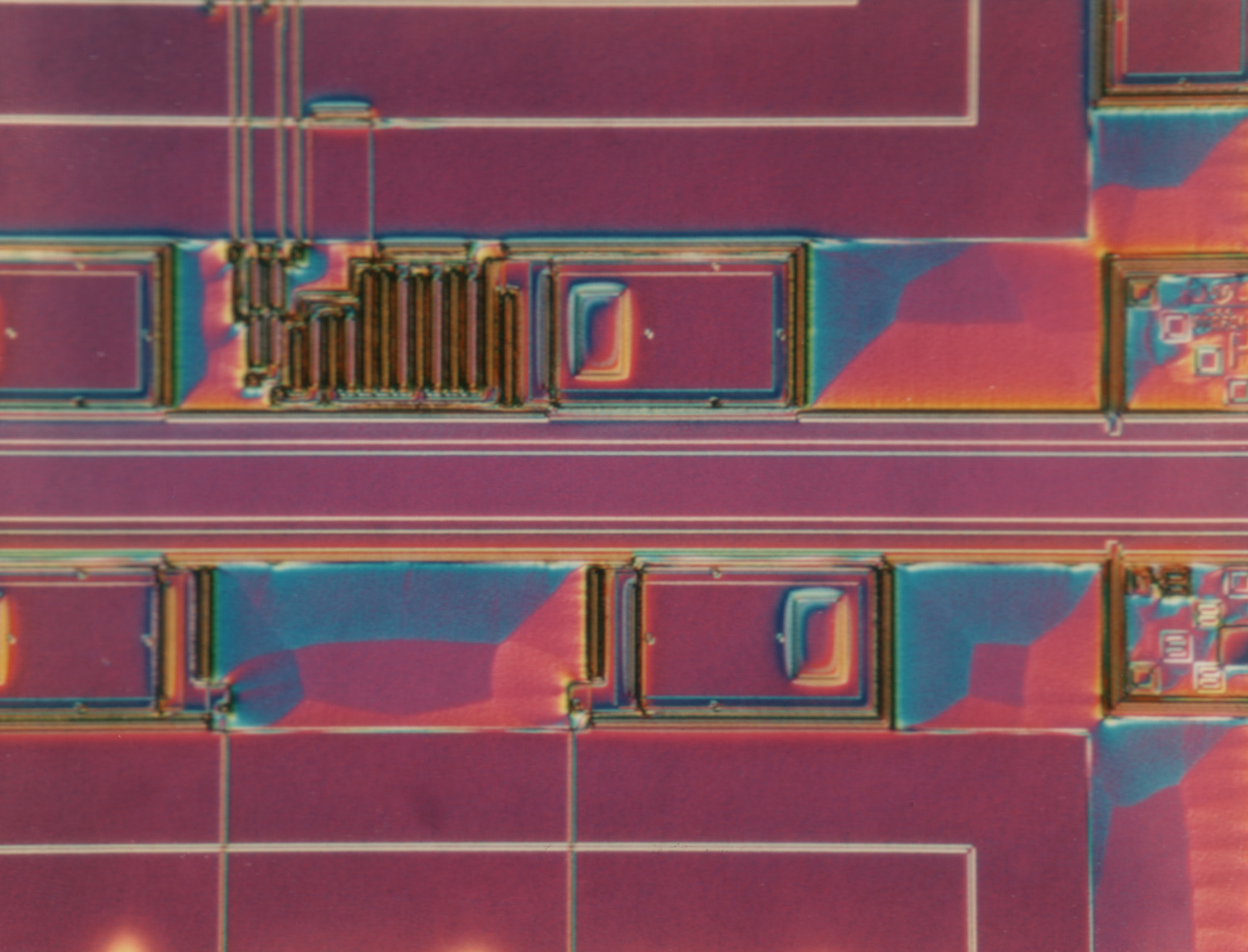
Partially developed photoresist in Nomarski DIC

DIC is used for imaging live and unstained biological samples, such as a smear from a tissue culture or individual water borne single-celled organisms. Owing to the maximally spatially incoherent illumination the theoretical resolution approaches the theoretical maximum coverage dictated by Ewald's sphere. This is an improvement on methods that require a higher degree of coherence like phase contrast.

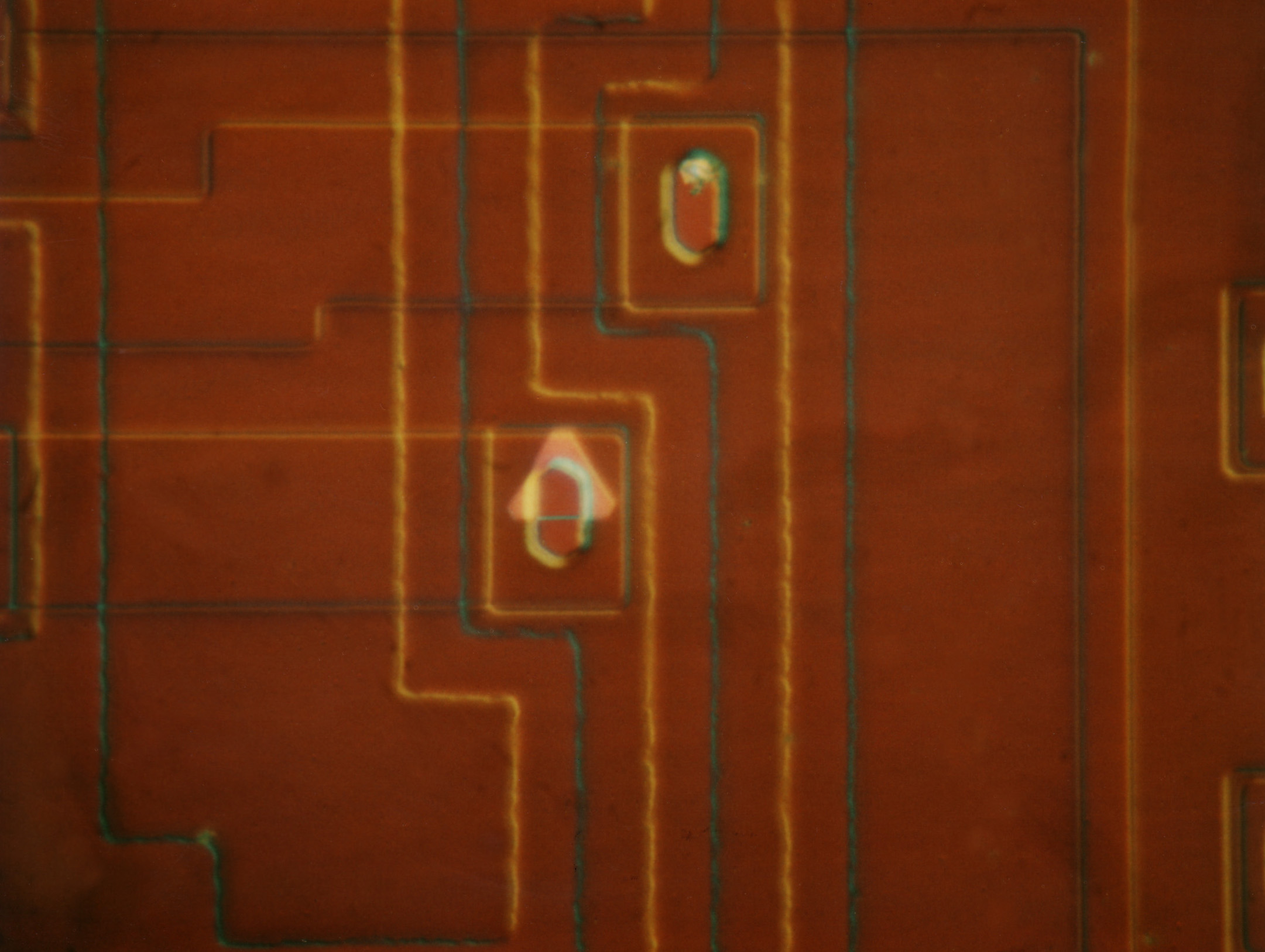
Aluminum–silicon alloying pit made visible by Nomarski DIC

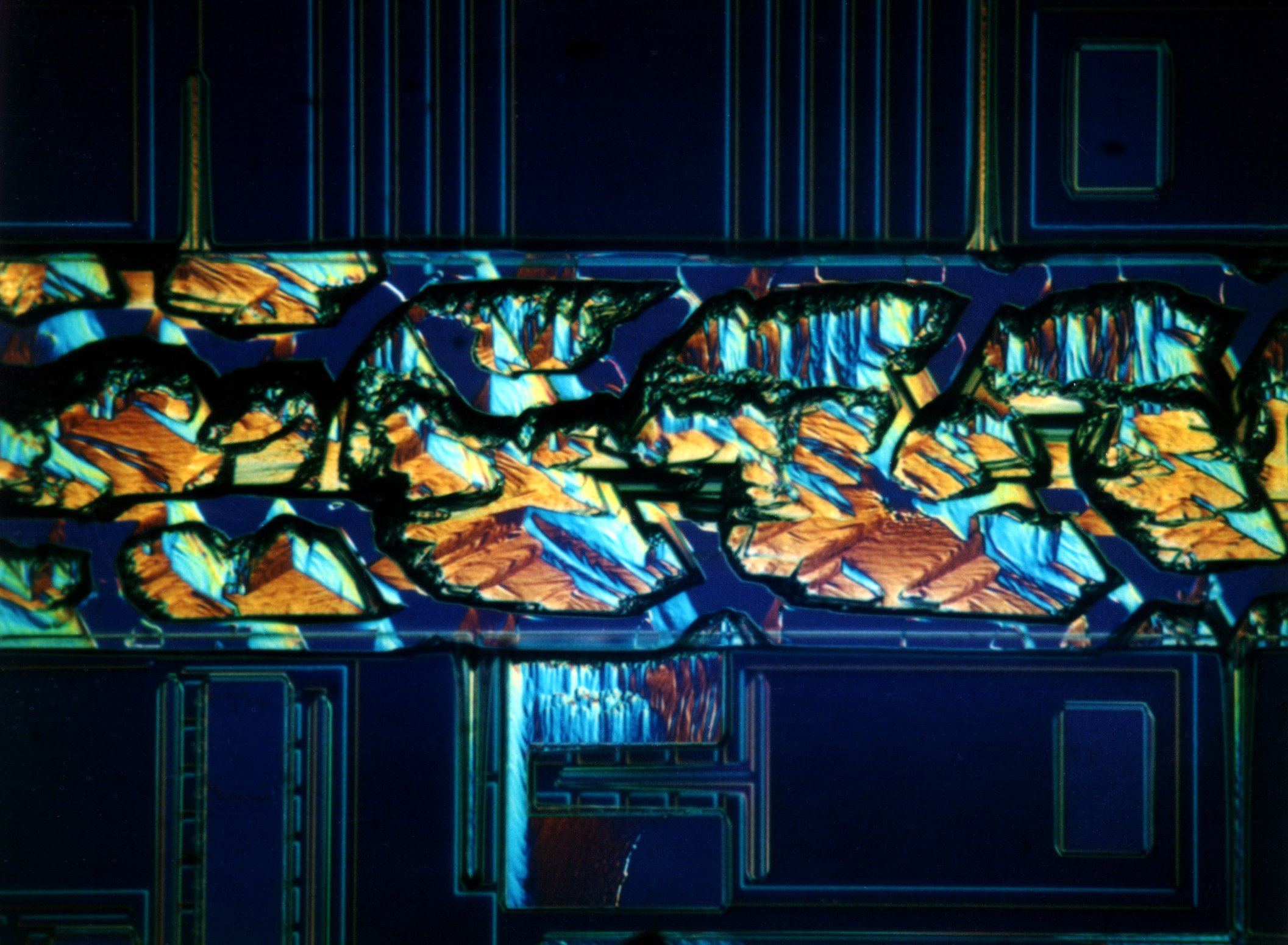
Partially etched silicon dioxide in Nomarski DIC

One non-biological area where DIC is used is in the analysis of planar silicon semiconductor processing. The thin (typically 100–1000 nm) films in silicon processing are often mostly transparent to visible light (e.g., silicon dioxide, silicon nitride and polycrystalline silicon), and defects in them or contamination lying on top of them become more visible. This also enables the determination of whether a feature is a pit in the substrate material or a blob of foreign material on top. Etched crystalline features gain a particularly striking appearance under DIC.

Image quality, when used under suitable conditions, is outstanding in resolution. However analysis of DIC images must always take into account the orientation of the Wollaston prisms and the apparent lighting direction, as features parallel to this will not be visible. This is, however, easily overcome by simply rotating the sample and observing changes in the image.

== See also ==
- Classical interference microscopy
- Nanovid microscopy
