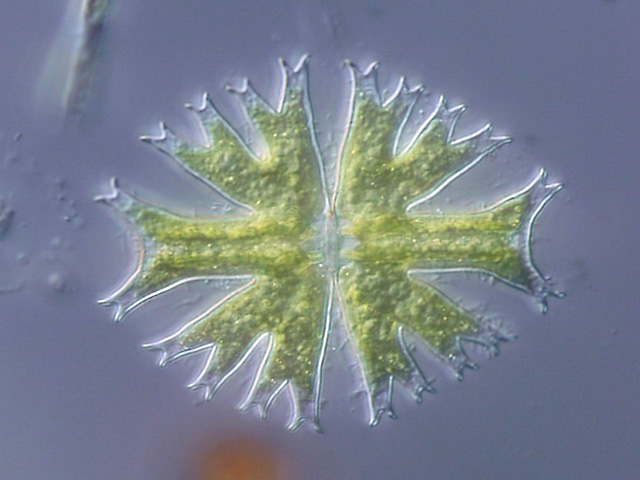
- Micrasterias furcata

Scientific classification
- Domain: Eukaryota
- Supergroup: Archaeplastida
- Clade: Viridiplantae
- Class: Zygnematophyceae
- Order: Desmidiales
- Family: Desmidiaceae
- Genus: Micrasterias; C.Agardh ex Ralfs

Type species
- Micrasterias furcata C.Agardh ex Ralfs

Species
- See text.

= Micrasterias =

Genus of algae

Micrasterias is a unicellular green alga of the order Desmidiales. Its species vary in size reaching up to hundreds of microns.

Micrasterias displays a bilateral symmetry, with two mirror image semi-cells joined by a narrow isthmus containing the nucleus of the organism. This dual semi-cell structure is unique to the group of green algae to which Micrasterias belongs. Each semi-cell contains a single large chloroplast, the site of photosynthesis for Micrasterias. Chloroplasts within Micrasterias contain chlorophyll a and chlorophyll b and the enzymes required for photosynthesis. The sugar created is used to provide energy for the organism or, if not used, taken up by many small round pyrenoids which are embedded in the chloroplast. They convert the sugar to a starch for storage.

Micrasterias can produce both asexually and sexually. Asexual reproduction occurs via mitosis. When this occurs the genetic material of Micrasterias is duplicated and two small semi-cells grow between the original semi-cells, gradually increasing in size. Sexual reproduction occurs through a process called conjugation whereby two organisms come together and fuse their haploid cells to form a diploid zygote. This zygote typically forms a thick protective wall which can allow the organism to remain dormant for many months to survive cold winters and long droughts. When adequate conditions resume, the zygospore will germinate, undergo meiosis, and produce new haploid algal cells.

== Description ==

Micrasterias species are symmetrical and generally consist of two flattened, identical portions called semicells that are almost entirely filled with chloroplasts, with a nucleus that lies at the center where the two semicells are joined together. The gaps between the two semicells are joined by an isthmus. Each semicell is further divided into a polar lobe and two lateral lobes. These lobes can be further subdivided up to the fourth order. Some species, such as Micrasterias laticeps, have a very different morphology, with unbranched lobes. Except for a single filament-forming species, Micrasterias foliacea, it is found as single cells. As is common in the green algae, the chloroplasts of Micrasterias contain pyrenoids.

Two species of Micrasterias have different morphologies to species traditionally placed in this genus, but molecular phylogenetic analyses demonstrate that they are embedded within Micrasterias. Micrasterias ralfsii (formerly classified as Cosmarium ralfsii) has no lobes, and the cells are smoothly ellipsoidal in outline. Micrasterias dickiei (formerly classified as Staurodesmus dickiei) is triradiate in polar view instead of flattened, and has three spines on each semicell.

=== Similar genera ===
Micrasterias is generally easy to identify due to its shape and typically large size.

The genus Pseudomicrasterias has been split off from the genus Micrasterias, and as of 2023, contains 2 species, formerly known as Micrasterias arcuata. They have a similar morphology to the simpler species of Micrasterias, but molecular phylogenetic analyses show that they are not related.

The genus Prescottiella contains a single species, Prescottiella sudanensis, formerly known as Micrasterias sudanensis. It is distinguished from Micrasterias in that its semicells are not identical, making the cell asymmetrical along one axis; the spines of one semicell curve towards the isthmus, while the spines of the other semicell curve away.

== Species ==
=== Accepted species ===
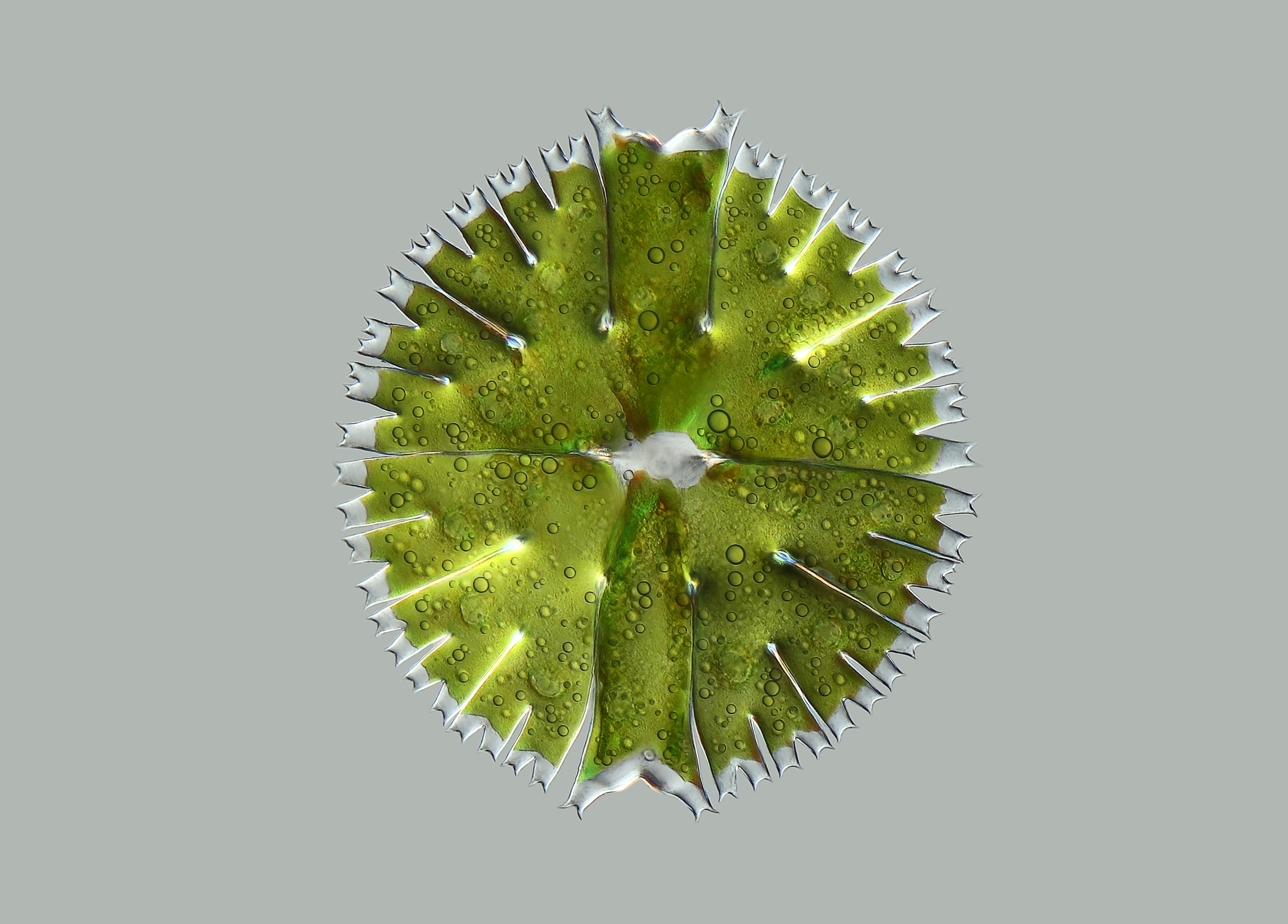
Micrasterias rotata

Micrasterias comprises the following species:

- Micrasterias abrupta West & G.S.West
- Micrasterias adscendens Nordstedt
- Micrasterias africana (F.E.Fritsch & F.Rich) Coesel & Van Geest
- Micrasterias alata Wallich
- Micrasterias ambadiensis (Grönblad & A.M.Scott) Kurt Föster
- Micrasterias americana Ehrenberg ex Ralfs
- Micrasterias anomala W.B.Turner
- Micrasterias apiculata Meneghini ex Ralfs
- Micrasterias archeri Coesel & M.Dingley
- Micrasterias bangladeshensis A.K.Islam & Haroon
- Micrasterias bewsii Fritsch & M.F.Rich
- Micrasterias bicoronata A.Kenins
- Micrasterias borgei Willi Krieger
- Micrasterias bourrellyana J.A.Rino
- Micrasterias brachyptera Lundell
- Micrasterias ceratofera Joshua
- Micrasterias compereana Neustupa, St'astný & Skaloud
- Micrasterias conferta Lundell
- Micrasterias croasdaleana C.E.M.Bicudo & L.Sormus
- Micrasterias crux-africana F.J.Cohn
- Micrasterias crux-melitensis Ralfs
- Micrasterias cunningtonii G.S.West
- Micrasterias decemdentata (Nägeli) W.Archer
- Micrasterias denboeri Coesel & Van Geest
- Micrasterias denticulata Brébisson ex Ralfs
- Micrasterias depauperata Nordstedt
- Micrasterias dickiei (Ralfs) Škaloud et al.
- Micrasterias divisa Willi Krieger
- Micrasterias echinata P.E.Brandham
- Micrasterias elegans (W.West & G.S.West) Coesel & Van Geest
- Micrasterias elongata (Schmidle) Coesel & Van Geest
- Micrasterias euastriellopsis Bharati
- Micrasterias excavata (Nordstedt) C.E.M.Bicudo & L.Sormus
- Micrasterias fimbriata Ralfs
- Micrasterias foersteri Thomasson
- Micrasterias foliacea Bailey ex Ralfs
- Micrasterias furcata C.Agardh ex Ralfs
- Micrasterias groenewaldii Claassen
- Micrasterias hardyi G.S.West
- Micrasterias hieronymusii Schmidle
- Micrasterias horrida C.E.Taft
- Micrasterias incisa Ralfs
- Micrasterias inflata C.Bernard
- Micrasterias integra Nordstedt
- Micrasterias jejuensis H.S.Kim
- Micrasterias jenneri Ralfs
- Micrasterias johnsonii West & G.S.West
- Micrasterias khasiae W.B.Turner
- Micrasterias koreana H.S.Kim
- Micrasterias laticeps Nordstedt
- Micrasterias lebrunii Oye
- Micrasterias ledouxii A.M.Scott & Croasdale
- Micrasterias lundii Bourrelly
- Micrasterias lux Joshua
- Micrasterias madagascariensis Coesel
- Micrasterias mahabuleshwarensis J.Hobson
- Micrasterias moebii (O.Borge) West & G.S.West
- Micrasterias muricata Bailey ex Ralfs
- Micrasterias nordstedtiana Wolle
- Micrasterias nordstedtii Thomasson
- Micrasterias nylstromica Claassen
- Micrasterias oscitans Ralfs
- Micrasterias papillifera Brébisson ex Ralfs
- Micrasterias pinnatifida Ralfs
- Micrasterias piquata R.K.Salisbury
- Micrasterias prescottiana C.E.M.Bicudo & L.Sormus
- Micrasterias pseudotorreyi Wolle
- Micrasterias quadridentata (Nordstedt) Grönblad
- Micrasterias quadriverrucosa (Thomasson) C.E.M.Bicudo & L.Sormus
- Micrasterias radians W.B.Turner
- Micrasterias radiosa Ralfs
- Micrasterias ralfsii (Brébisson ex Ralfs) Škaloud et al.
- Micrasterias rotata Ralfs
- Micrasterias sanctipaulensis C.E.M.Bicudo & L.Sormus
- Micrasterias schmidleana Coesel & Van Geest
- Micrasterias schweickerdtii M.I.Claassen
- Micrasterias schweinfurthii Cohn
- Micrasterias semiradiata Brébisson ex Kützing
- Micrasterias sexpinata (Irénée-Marie & Hilliard) H.Croasdale & G.W.Prescott
- Micrasterias simplex Børgesen
- Micrasterias spinosa H.S.Kim
- Micrasterias stauromorpha W.B.Turner
- Micrasterias subaequalis Grönblad
- Micrasterias subdenticulata (Nordstedt) Willi Krieger
- Micrasterias subincisa Willi Krieger
- Micrasterias suboblonga Nordstedt
- Micrasterias subtruncata A.I.Lobik
- Micrasterias tetraptera West & G.S.West
- Micrasterias thomasiana W.Archer
- Micrasterias torreyi Bailey
- Micrasterias triangularis Wolle
- Micrasterias tropica Nordstedt
- Micrasterias truncata Brébisson ex Ralfs
- Micrasterias verrucosa Bisset
- Micrasterias zeylanica F.E.Fritsch

=== Species names with uncertain taxonomic status ===
The status of the following species is unresolved:

- Micrasterias aculeata M.Rostock
- Micrasterias berganii H.V.Hauge
- Micrasterias bicaudata (A.K.H.Braun ex Kützing) Kuntze
- Micrasterias bioctonaria G.Rabenhorst
- Micrasterias boryana (P.J.F.Turpin) Ehrenberg
- Micrasterias boryi Kützing
- Micrasterias braunii (C.W.Nägeli ex Kützing) Kuntze
- Micrasterias comperei R.S.Ganem & P.A.C.Senna
- Micrasterias complecta C.G.T.Preuss
- Micrasterias convoluta (A.K.J.Corda) Kuntze
- Micrasterias cordae A.Braun
- Micrasterias coronula Ehrenberg
- Micrasterias cruciata Kützing
- Micrasterias crucigenia Kützing
- Micrasterias decemdentatum (C.W.Nägeli) W.Archer
- Micrasterias denticula Istvanfy
- Micrasterias duplex (Meyen) Kützing
- Micrasterias ecornis Ehrenberg
- Micrasterias eichleri Schmidle
- Micrasterias enneactis Ehrenberg
- Micrasterias extendens W.B.Turner
- Micrasterias falcata Corda
- Micrasterias floridensis R.K.Salisbury
- Micrasterias galeata Borge
- Micrasterias ghibellina Meneghini
- Micrasterias granulata H.C.Wood
- Micrasterias halis Raciborski
- Micrasterias hamata (Wolle) F.C.E.Børgesen
- Micrasterias heliactis Kützing
- Micrasterias heptactis Ehrenberg
- Micrasterias hermanniana Reinsch
- Micrasterias hexactis Ehrenberg
- Micrasterias hexagona G.W.Grant
- Micrasterias hexagonalis F.Steinecke
- Micrasterias kangofurinensis N.Woodhead & R.D.Tweed
- Micrasterias lacerata Kützing
- Micrasterias margaritifera (P.J.F.Turpin) L.A.Brébisson & P.Godet
- Micrasterias mbugensis E.M.Lind
- Micrasterias melitensis G.G.A.Meneghini
- Micrasterias mohii (Borge) Authority Unknown
- Micrasterias multifida Wolle
- Micrasterias napoleonis (P.J.F.Turpin) Kützing
- Micrasterias nordstetiana Wolle
- Micrasterias oblonga Ehrenberg
- Micrasterias ornamentalis O.Borge
- Micrasterias paradoxa Kützing
- Micrasterias platyptera W.B.Turner
- Micrasterias polonica (B.Eichler & R.Gutwinski) West & G.S.West
- Micrasterias polycyclia G.Rabenhorst
- Micrasterias pseudofurcata Wolle
- Micrasterias quadragies-cuspidata (Corda) Ralfs
- Micrasterias renicarpa (Turpin) Kützing
- Micrasterias ricciaeformis C.Agardh
- Micrasterias robusta West & G.S.West
- Micrasterias rosula Kützing
- Micrasterias selenaea Kützing
- Micrasterias senaria Ehrenberg
- Micrasterias simplex (Meyen) Kützing
- Micrasterias simplex Wolle
- Micrasterias simplex Kurt Förster & F.Eckert
- Micrasterias sinuata L.A.Brébisson
- Micrasterias siolii A.M.Scott & Croasdale
- Micrasterias sphaerastrum Kützing
- Micrasterias staurastrum Kützing
- Micrasterias subfimbriata Wolle
- Micrasterias sublagoensis Kurt Förster & F.Eckert
- Micrasterias tetracera Kützing
- Micrasterias tricera Kützing
- Micrasterias tricyclia Ehrenberg
- Micrasterias trigemina E.H.P.A.Haeckel
- Micrasterias upsaliensis (Cleve) W.Archer

== Phylogenetics ==
Modern molecular phylogenetics suggest the following relationships (not all accepted species are included):

- - Micrasterias
    - - - - - Clade A
              - - - - - A1
                        - - Micrasterias truncata
                          - Micrasterias ralfsii
                        - Micrasterias semiradiata
                      - A2
                        - Micrasterias decemdentata
                        - Micrasterias laticeps
                    - A3
                      - Micrasterias zeylanica
                      - Micrasterias truncata var. pusilla
                  - A4
                    - Micrasterias furcata
                    - - Micrasterias pinnatifida
                      - Micrasterias dickiei
                - A5
                  - Micrasterias ceratofera
                  - - Micrasterias crux-melitensis pro parte
                    - Micrasterias radians var. bogoriensis
              - A6
                - Micrasterias crux-melitensis pro parte
                - Micrasterias radians var. evoluta
            - - Clade B
                - Micrasterias anomala
                - Micrasterias apiculata
              - Clade C
                - - Micrasterias brachyptera
                  - Micrasterias fimbriata
                - - Micrasterias rotata
                  - Micrasterias doveri
          - Clade D
            - Micrasterias thomasiana
            - - Micrasterias denticulata
              - Micrasterias jenneri
        - Clade E
          Triploceras
      - - Clade F
          Micrasterias tropica
        - Clade G
          - Micrasterias foliacea
          - - Micrasterias radiosa var. swainei
            - - Micrasterias tetraptera
              - - Micrasterias conferta
                - - Micrasterias radiosa var. radiosa
                  - - Micrasterias novae-terrae
                    - Micrasterias papillifera
    - Clade H
      - Micrasterias hardyi
      - - Micrasterias americana
        - - Micrasterias mahabuleshwarensis
          - Micrasterias muricata
  - Staurastrum (outgroup)

Even though Triploceras was recovered as embedded within Micrasterias, there was low statistical support for this placement, so it remains a separate genus.

== Habitat and distribution ==
As with other desmids, Micrasterias grows in freshwater habitats. It prefers oligotrophic to mesotrophic lakes and bogs, often associated with aquatic plants.

Freshwater microalgae, along with other microscopic organisms, are often presumed to be cosmopolitan in distribution (see the Baas Becking hypothesis). However, many desmids are an exception to this, likely because of their high morphological complexity allowing for easier identification, and the fact that they mostly do not form resting spores that would allow for wider dispersal. In particular, a number of Micrasterias species are restricted to certain biogeographical realms or continents. For example, Micrasterias muricata appears to be endemic to North America, while Micrasterias ceratofera is restricted to Southeast Asia and northern Australia.
