= Abbe prism =

Dispersive prism

In optics, an Abbe prism, named for its inventor, the German physicist Ernst Abbe, is a type of constant deviation dispersive prism similar to a Pellin–Broca prism.

== Structure ==
Abbe prism

The prism consists of a block of glass forming a right prism with 30°–60°–90° triangular faces. When in use, a beam of light enters face AB, is refracted and undergoes total internal reflection from face BC, and is refracted again on exiting face AC. The prism is designed such that one particular wavelength of the light exits the prism at a deviation angle (relative to the light's original path) of exactly 60°. This is the minimum possible deviation of the prism, all other wavelengths being deviated by greater angles. By rotating the prism (in the plane of the diagram) around any point O on the face AB, the wavelength which is deviated by 60° can be selected.

The dispersive Abbe prism should not be confused with the non-dispersive Porro–Abbe or Abbe–Koenig prisms.
