= Pellin–Broca prism =

Dispersive prism

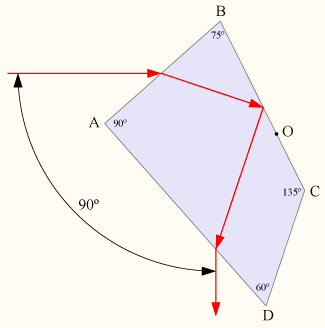
A Pellin–Broca prism

A Pellin–Broca prism is a type of constant-deviation dispersive prism similar to an Abbe prism.

The prism is named for its inventors, the French instrument maker Ph. Pellin and professor of physiological optics André Broca.

The prism consists of a four-sided block of glass shaped as a right prism with 90°, 75°, 135°, and 60° angles on the end faces. Light enters the prism through face AB, undergoes total internal reflection from face BC, and exits through face AD. The refraction of the light as it enters and exits the prism is such that one particular wavelength of the light is deviated by exactly 90°. As the prism is rotated around an axis O, the line of intersection of bisector of ∠BAD and the reflecting face BC, the selected wavelength which is deviated by 90° is changed without changing the geometry or relative positions of the input and output beams.

The prism is commonly used to separate a single required wavelength from a light beam containing multiple wavelengths, such as a particular output line from a multi-line laser due to its ability to separate beams even after they have undergone a non-linear frequency conversion. For this reason, they are also commonly used in optical atomic spectroscopy.
