= Extinction cross =

Optical phenomenon

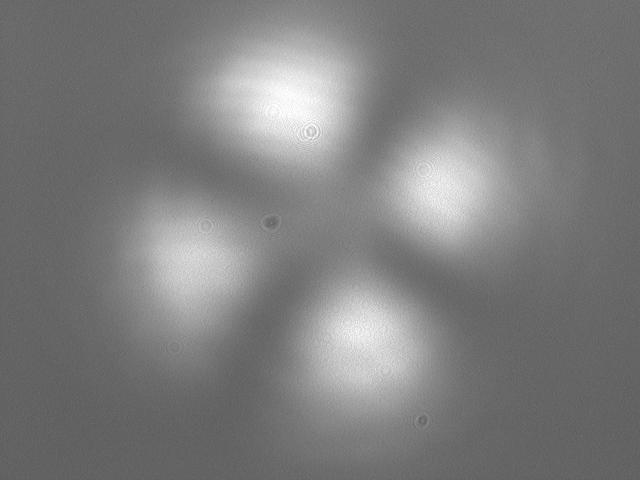
An extinction cross photographed with a CCD camera using a green laser beam and a polarizer

The extinction cross is an optical phenomenon that is seen when trying to extinguish a laser beam or non-planar white light using crossed polarizers. Ideally, crossed (90° rotated) polarizers block all light, because light that is polarized along the polarization axis of the first polarizer is perpendicular to the polarization axis of the second. When the beam is not perfectly collimated, however, a characteristic fringing pattern is produced.

== See also ==
- Polarization (waves)
