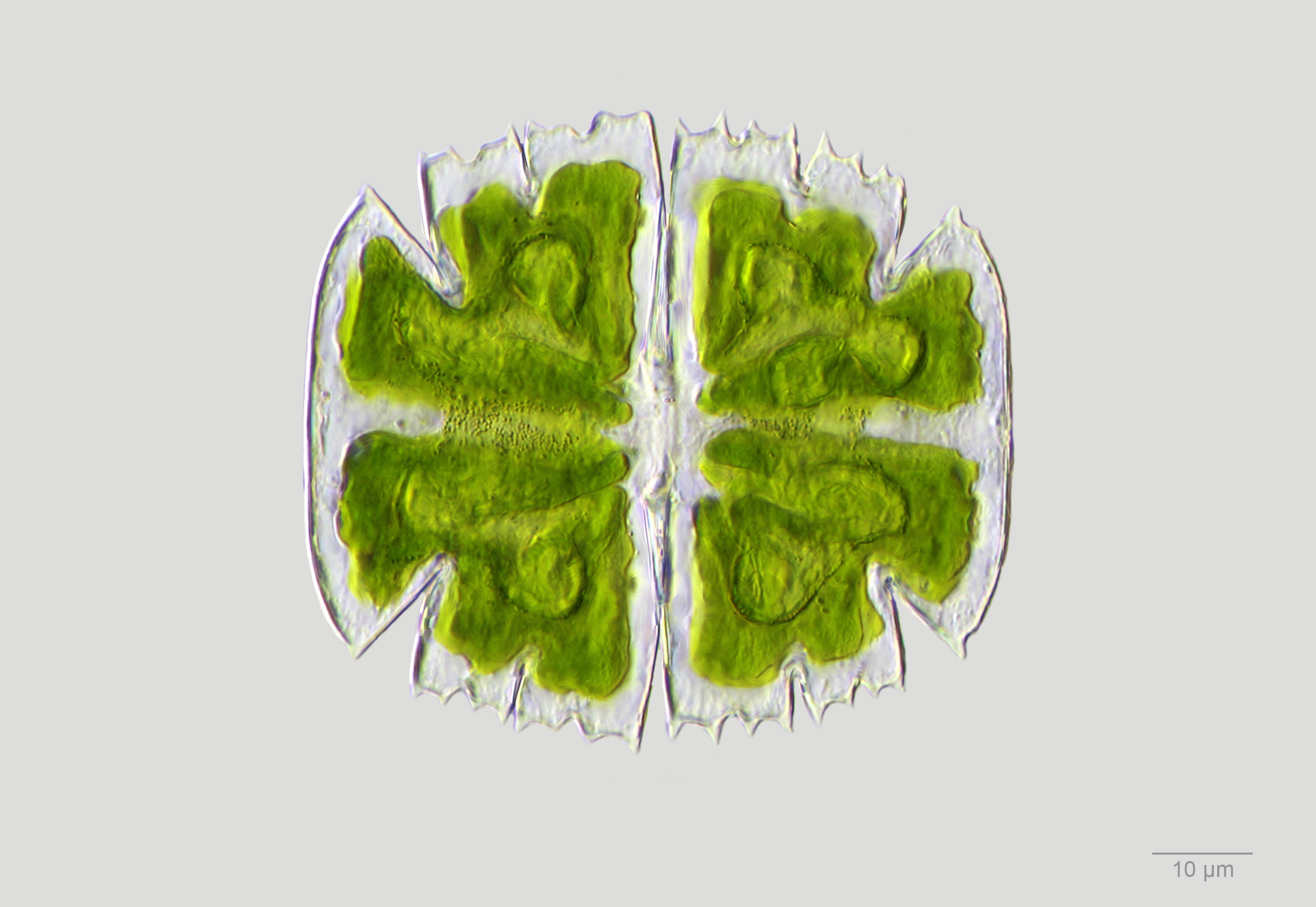

Scientific classification
- Domain: Eukaryota
- Clade: Archaeplastida
- Clade: Viridiplantae
- Class: Zygnematophyceae
- Order: Desmidiales
- Family: Desmidiaceae
- Genus: Micrasterias
- Species: M. truncata

Binomial name
- Micrasterias truncata Brébisson ex Ralfs

= Micrasterias truncata =

Species of alga

Micrasterias truncata is a species of desmid, a type of alga which inhabits freshwater areas. It inhabits acidic, mesotrophic waters. One of the most common species of Micrasterias, it is widely distributed on all continents, but most common in the North Temperate zone.

== Description ==
The typical variety of Micrasterias truncata is a unicellular alga which are somewhat flattened, thus appearing spindle-shaped when viewed from the top and elliptical when viewed from the side. Cells are (60–)85–120(–145) μm long and (60–)80–110(–135) μm wide, slightly longer than wide. They consist two identical halves, termed semi-cells, which are joined together at the center of the cell (the isthmus) with closed sinuses separating the two semi-cells. Semi-cells are trapezoidal to semicircular in outline.

Each semi-cell has three deeply divided lobes, one polar and two lateral. The polar lobe is strongly widened near the cell apex. The side lobes are generally divided twice; lobes are short and broad and separated by narrow, shallow incisions. The angles of the apical lobes and the angles of the highest-order side lobes are denticulate. The incisions between the apical and side lobes are closed or narrowly open. Each semi-cell has a chloroplast with raised, longitudinal ridges and a few pyrenoids. The cell wall is punctate; the pores secrete a mucilaginous sheath around the cell.

== Reproduction ==
Like other desmids, Micrasterias truncata reproduces asexually via cell division. Two new semi-cells are formed between the parental semi-cells. The developing semi-cells first contain only cytoplasm, then the divided nuclei migrate into them. The chloroplast migrates in later.

Sexual reproduction in Micrasterias truncata results in the formation of zygospores, which are spherical and armed with long, sometimes curved spines. The zygospores are 75–80 μm in diameter without spines, and 118–130 μm including spines.

== Taxonomy ==
Micrasterias truncata is highly variable, with many named varieties and forms. Some examples include:

- Variety bahusiensis has apical and side lobes separated by a widely open incision. The polar lobe ends in two conical extensions terminated by an apical spine.
- Variety carteri has lateral lobes which are only divided to the first order by a small, shallow incision. The apical lobe is helmet-shaped, bearing a spine tip on either side.
- Variety concatenata consists of barrel-shaped cells connected together in chains.
- Variety pusilla is smaller, about 55–65 μm long and 64–66 μm wide and nearly circular in outline.

Many taxa are doubtfully valid and are likely synonyms. On the other hand, studies incorporating molecular phylogenetics with morphometrics found that some, such as M. truncata var. pusilla, are likely separate species. Indeed, a few species of Micrasterias were formerly considered to be varieties of M. truncata but have been split into separate species. These include Micrasterias africana and Micrasterias semiradiata.
