= Polarizing filter (photography) =

Lens filter for cameras

Circular polarizer/linear analyzer filtering unpolarized light and then circularly polarizing the result

A polarizing filter or polarising filter (see spelling differences) is a filter that is often placed in front of a camera lens in photography in order to darken skies, manage reflections, or suppress glare from the surface of lakes or the sea. Since reflections (and sky-light) tend to be at least partially linearly-polarized, a linear polarizer can be used to change the balance of the light in the photograph. The rotational orientation of the filter is adjusted for the preferred artistic effect.

For modern cameras, a circular polarizer (CPL) is typically used, which has a linear polarizer that performs the artistic function just described, followed by a quarter-wave plate, which further transforms the linearly polarized light into circularly-polarized light. The circular polarization avoids problems with autofocus and the light-metering sensors in some cameras, which otherwise may not function reliably with only a linear polarizer.

== Use ==
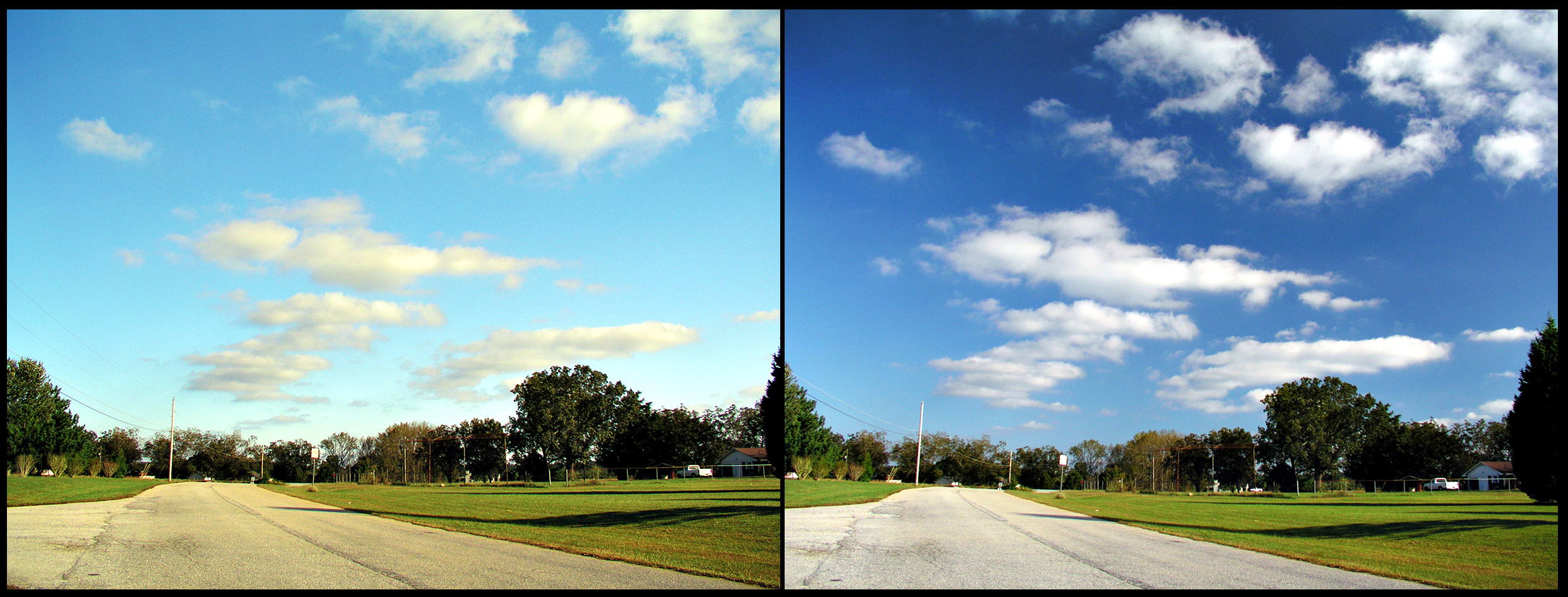
Filtered on right, ⇢. A polarizer filters out the polarized component of light from the sky in a color photograph, increasing contrast with the clouds (right).

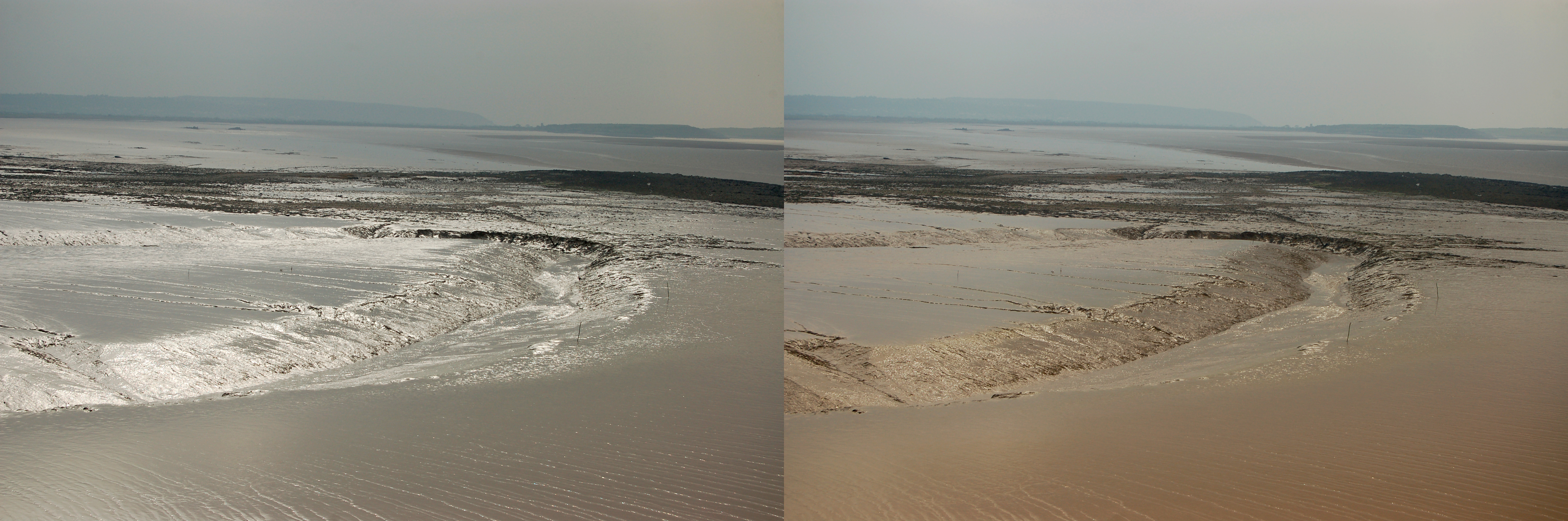
Filtered on right, ⇢. Polarizer aligned to allow the light reflected by the water (left), rotated by 90° to block it (right).

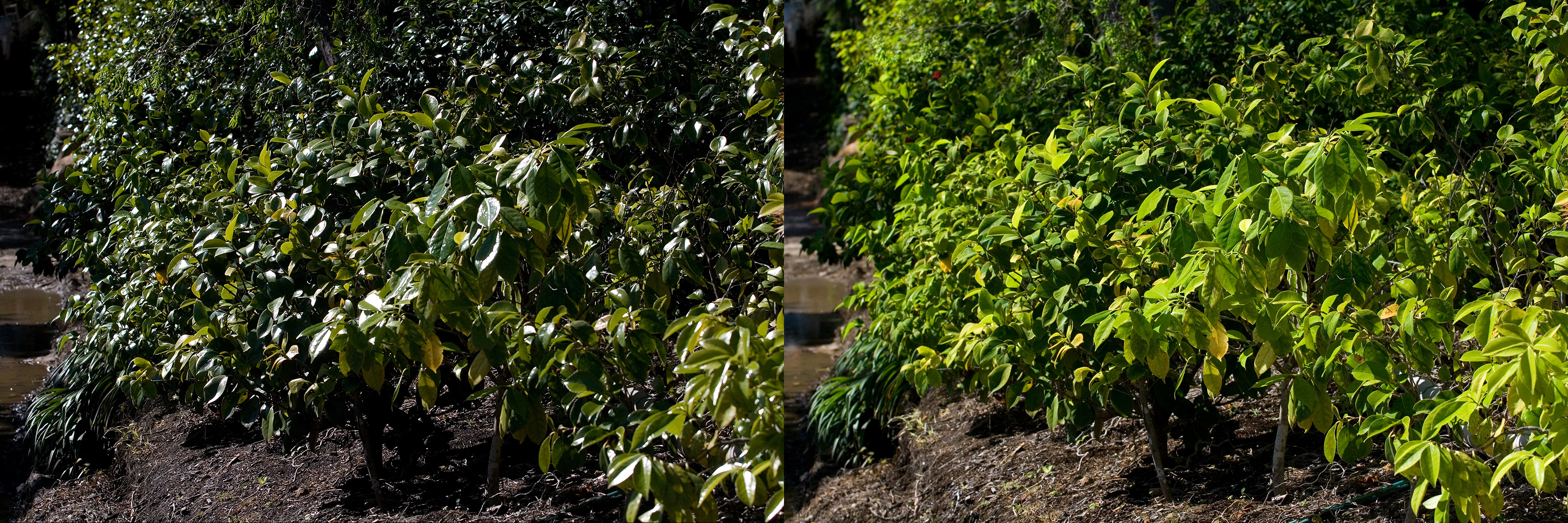
Filtered on right, ⇢. Polarizers are often used to improve the appearance of vegetation.

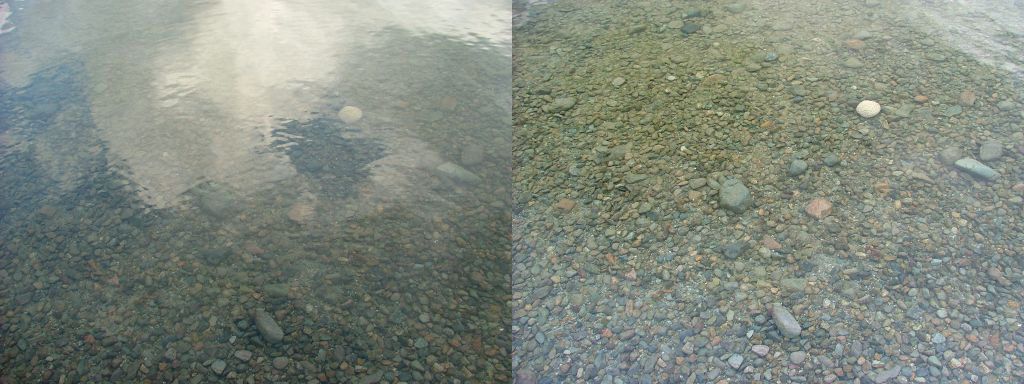
Filtered on right, ⇢. Effect of polarizer on light reflected from a water surface. The polarizing filter is used on the right.

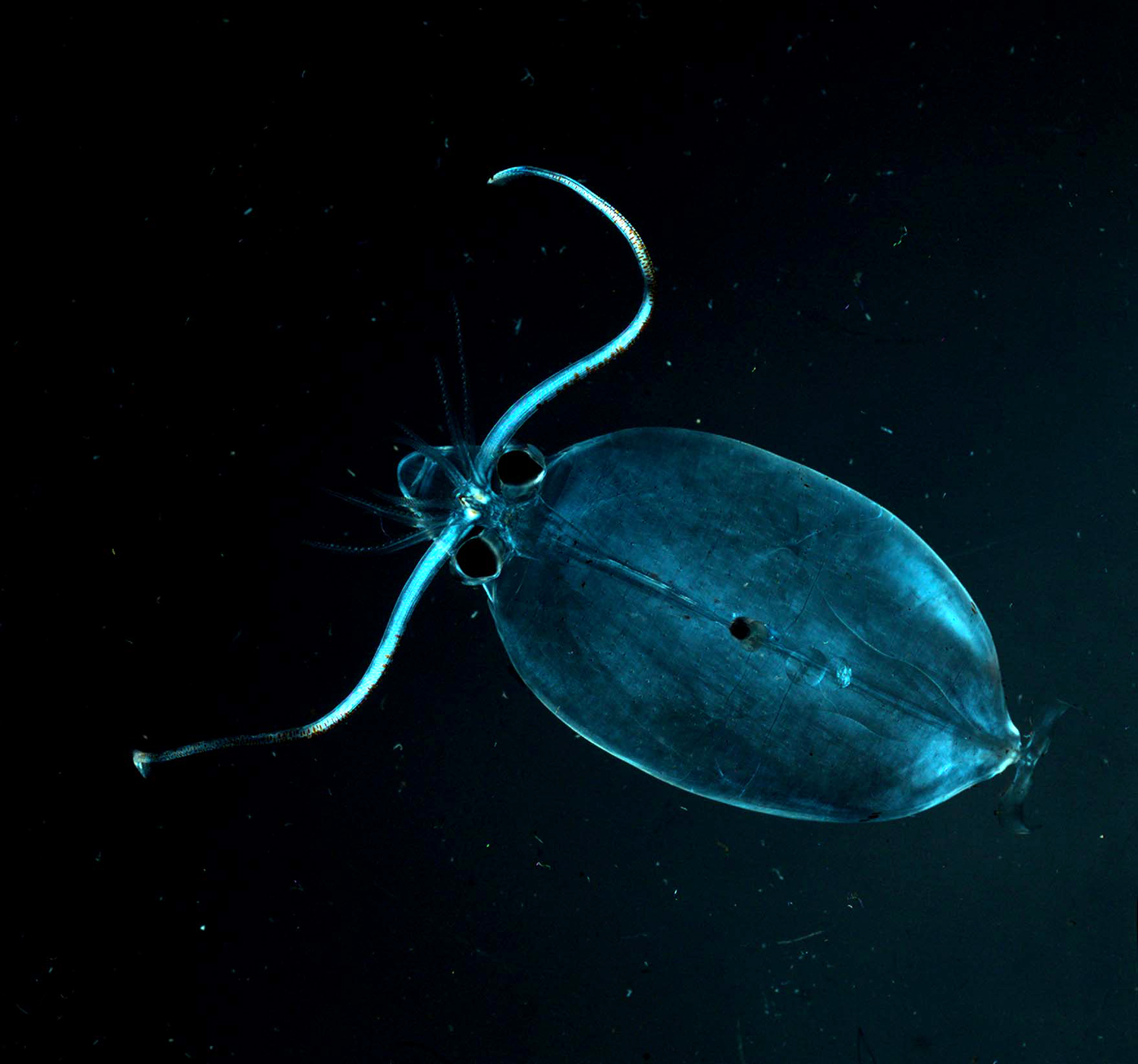
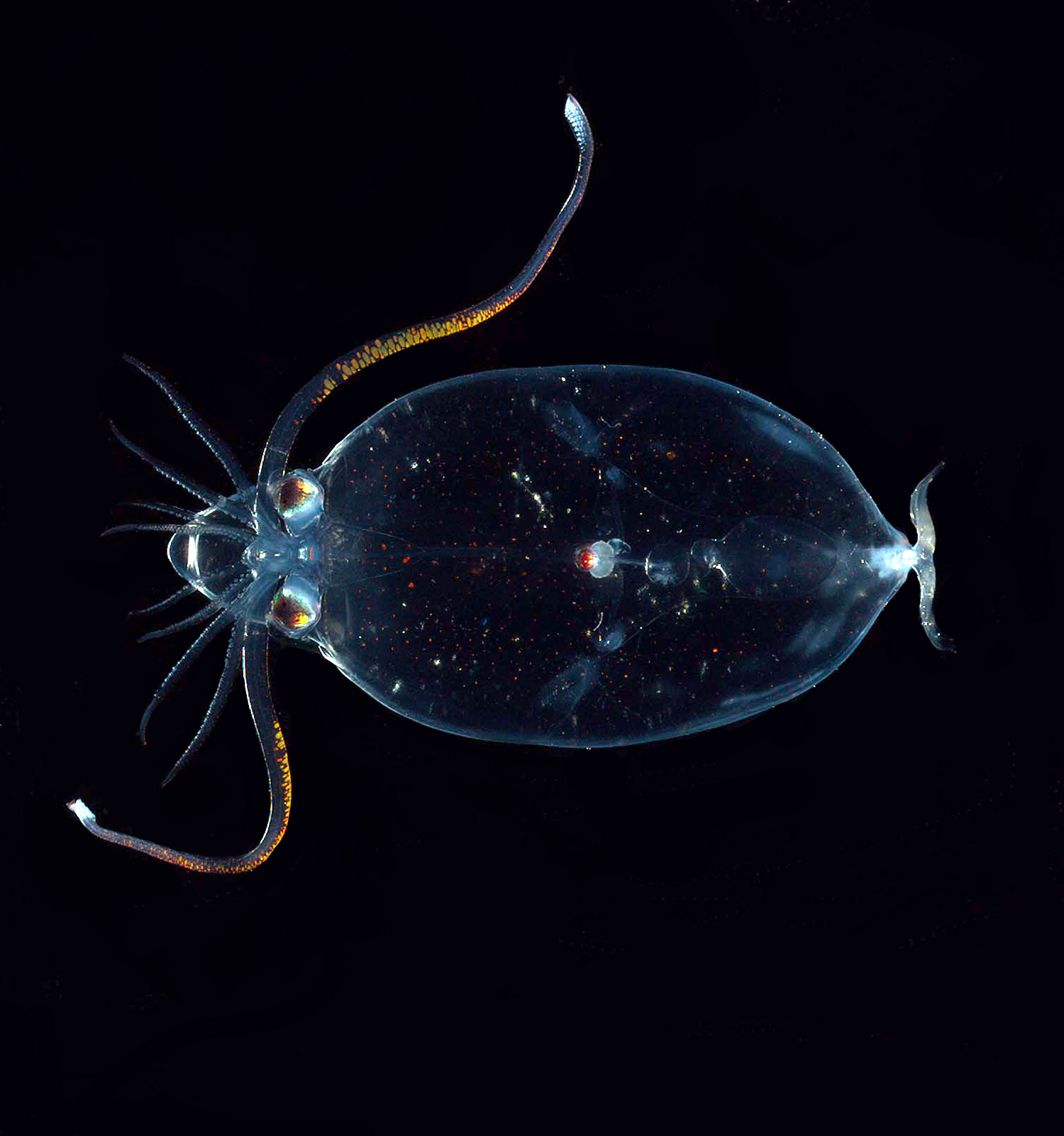
Filtered on right, ⇢. A glass squid photographed without (left) and with a polarizing filter (right)

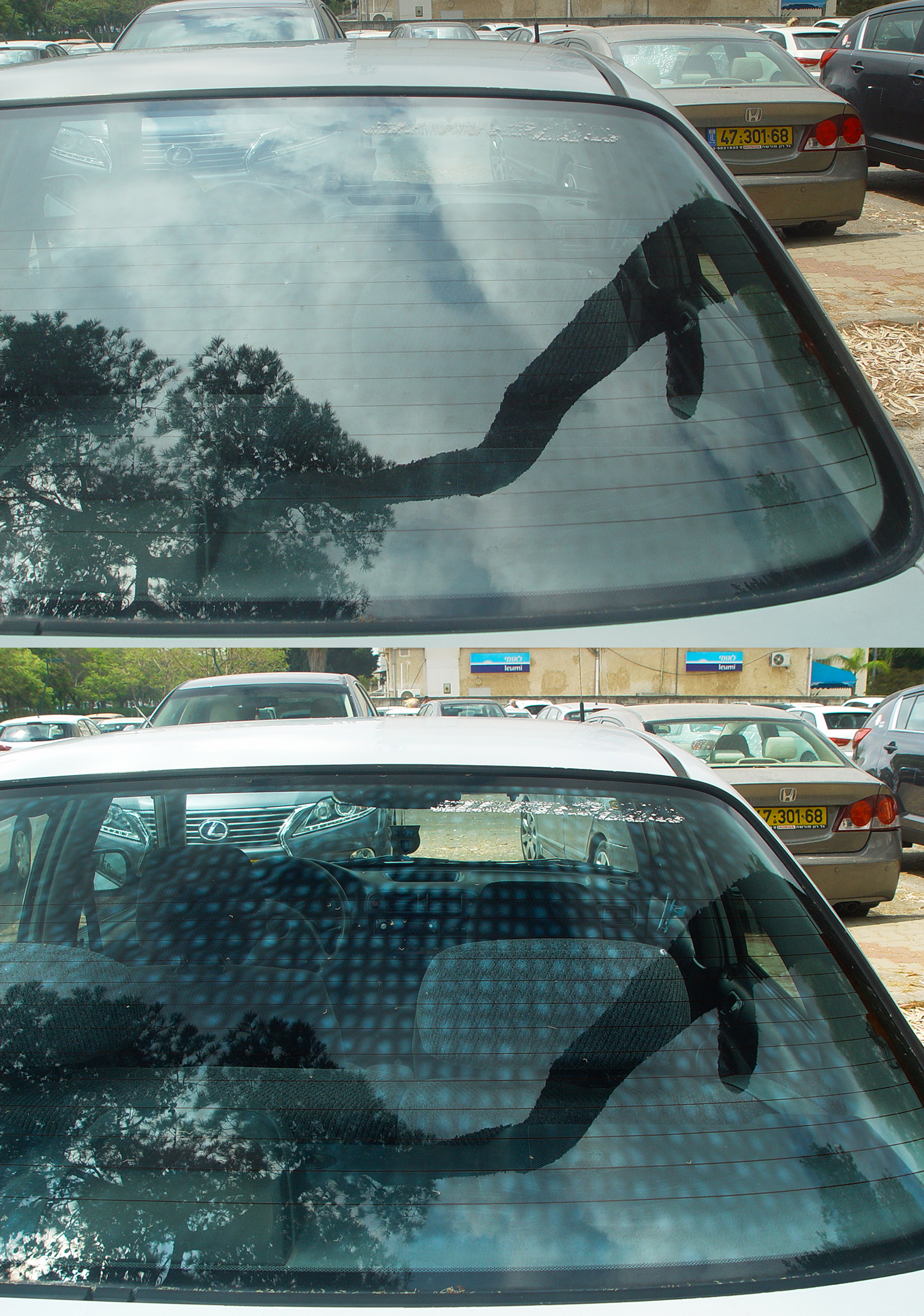
Filtered at bottom, ⬇. Toughened glass of car rear window. Variations in glass stress are clearly seen when photographed through a polarizing filter (bottom picture).

Animated polarizer in front of a computer flat screen monitor. LCD monitors emit polarized light, typically at 45° to the vertical, so when the polarizer axis is perpendicular to the polarization of the light from the screen, no light passes through (the polarizer appears black). When parallel to the screen polarization, the polarizer allows the light to pass and the white of the screen is seen.

Video of the effects of a polarizer

0 degrees rotation	30 degrees rotation
60 degrees rotation	90 degrees rotation

Light reflected from a non-metallic surface becomes polarized; this effect is maximum at Brewster's angle, about 56° from the vertical for common glass. A polarizer rotated to pass only light polarized in the direction perpendicular to the reflected light will absorb much of it. This absorption allows glare reflected from, for example, a body of water or a road to be reduced. In practice, reflections from non-metallic surfaces are strongly polarized when they leave the surface at an angle of about 30 to 40°. Reflections from shiny surfaces (e.g. vegetation, sweaty skin, water surfaces, glass) are also reduced. This allows the natural color and detail of what is beneath to come through. Reflections from a window into a dark interior can be much reduced, allowing it to be seen through. (The same effects are available for vision by using polarizing sunglasses.)

Some of the light coming from the sky is polarized (bees use this phenomenon for navigation). The electrons in the air molecules cause a scattering of sunlight in all directions. This explains why the sky is not dark during the day. But when looked at from the sides, the light emitted from a specific electron is totally polarized. Hence, a picture taken in a direction at 90 degrees from the sun can take advantage of this polarization. Actually, the effect is visible in a band of 15° to 30° measured from the optimal direction. With wide-angle lenses the degree of polarization varies across the field of view, so a polarizer can produce a visible gradient from light to dark blue across the sky.

Use of a polarizing filter, in the correct direction, will filter out the polarized component of skylight, darkening the sky; the landscape below it, and clouds, will be less affected, giving a photograph with a darker and more dramatic sky, and emphasizing the clouds. Perpendicularly incident light waves tend to reduce clarity and saturation of certain colors, which increases haziness. The polarizing lens effectively absorbs these light waves, rendering outdoor scenes crisper with deeper color tones in subject matter such as blue skies, bodies of water and foliage.

Much light is differentiated by polarization, e.g. light passing through crystals like sunstones (calcite) or water droplets producing rainbows. The polarization of the rainbow is caused by the internal reflection. The rays strike the back surface of the drop close to the Brewster angle.

Polarizing filters can be rotated to maximize or minimize admission of polarized light. They are mounted in a rotating collar for this purpose; one need not screw or unscrew the filter to adjust the effect. Rotating the polarizing filter will make rainbows, reflections, and other polarized light stand out or nearly disappear depending on how much of the light is polarized and the angle of polarization.

The benefits of polarizing filters are the same in digital or film photography. While software post-processing can simulate many other types of filter, a photograph does not record the light polarization, so the effects of controlling polarization at the time of exposure, especially the removal of reflections, cannot be replicated in software.

== Types ==
There are two types of polarizing filters readily available, linear and circular, which have exactly the same effect photographically. But the metering and auto-focus sensors in certain cameras, including virtually all auto-focus single-lens reflex cameras (SLRs), will not work properly with linear polarizers because the beam splitters used to split off the light for focusing and metering are polarization-dependent. Linearly-polarized light may also defeat the action of the anti-aliasing filter (low-pass filter) on the imaging sensor.

Circular polarizing photographic filters consist of a linear polarizer on the front, with a quarter-wave plate on the back. The quarter-wave plate converts the selected polarization to circularly polarized light inside the camera. This works with all types of cameras, because mirrors and beam-splitters split circularly polarized light the same way they split unpolarized light.

Linear polarizing filters can be easily distinguished from circular polarizers. In linear polarizing filters, the polarizing effect works (rotate to see differences) regardless of which side of the filter the scene is viewed from. In "circular" polarizing filters, the polarizing effect works when the scene is viewed from the male threaded (back) side of the filter, but does not work when looking through it backwards.

== Other effects ==
Polarizing filters reduce the light passed through to the film or sensor, by up to about two stops according to Canon, the exact amount depending on the filter and on how much of the light is polarized at the filter angle selected. Auto-exposure cameras will adjust for this by widening the aperture, lengthening the time the shutter is open, and/or increasing the ASA/ISO speed of the camera. Polarizing filters can be used deliberately to reduce available light and allow use of wider apertures to shorten depth of field for certain focus effects.

Some companies make adjustable neutral density filters by having two linear polarizing layers. When they are at 90° to each other, they let almost zero light in, admitting more as the angle decreases.

== See also ==
- Polarized 3D glasses
