= Georges Nomarski =

Polish physicist and optics theoretician

Georges (Jerzy) Nomarski (January 6, 1919 – 1997) was a Polish physicist and optics theoretician. He was the creator of differential interference contrast (DIC) microscopy. The method is widely used to study live biological specimens and unstained tissues and in many languages bears his name.

== Biography ==
Born in Nowy Targ, Nomarski was educated in Warsaw at the Warsaw University of Technology (known at that time as the Warsaw Polytechnic) and served in the Polish Resistance during World War II. Captured by German forces, he was a prisoner of war until March 1945. After the war when the Soviets supported communists installed their regime over Poland, Nomarski had to escape to Belgium as a political refugee. He studied there briefly before he moved to France for his permanent residence in 1947. He finished his education in France and received his diploma from l'Ecole Supérieure d'Optique Paris (Grande Ecole). In 1950, Nomarski established the Laboratoire de Microscopie Optique de L'Institut d'Optique and became a professor of microscopy and head of the department at his alma mater. He simultaneously conducted research at the Centre National de la Recherche Scientifique (CNRS), where the physicist rose to the Directorship of Research by 1965.

== Honors ==
- Fellow of the Optical Society of America (1972)
- Honorary Fellow by the Royal Microscopical Society
- Member of the Polish Society of Arts and Sciences Abroad
- Abbe Medal recipient
- SPIE Gold Medal (1995)

== See also ==
- Nomarski prism
- Differential interference contrast microscopy
