= Sénarmont prism =

Type of polarizer

Working principle of a Sénarmont prism

The Sénarmont prism is a type of polariser. It is made from two prisms of a birefringent material such as calcite, usually cemented together. The Sénarmont prism is named after Henri Hureau de Sénarmont. It is similar to the Rochon and Wollaston prisms.

In the Sénarmont prism the s-polarized ray (i.e., the ray with polarization direction perpendicular to the plane in which all rays are contained, called the plane of incidence) passes through without being deflected, while the p-polarized ray (with polarization direction in the plane of incidence) is deflected (refracted) at the internal interface into a different direction. Both rays correspond to ordinary rays (o-rays) in the first component prism, since both polarization directions are perpendicular to the optical axis, which is the propagation direction. In the second component prism the s-polarized ray remains ordinary (o-ray, polarized perpendicular to the optical axis), while the p-polarized ray becomes extraordinary (e-ray), with a polarization component along the optical axis. As a consequence, the s-polarized ray is not deflected since the effective refractive index does not change across the interface. The p-polarized wave, on the other hand, is refracted because the effective refractive index changes upon changing from o-ray to e-ray.

The Sénarmont prism is similar in construction and action to the Rochon prism, as in both polarizers the ray that is not deflected is the o-ray after the internal interface, while the deflected ray is the e-ray. However, in the Rochon prism, it is the p-polarized ray that remains an o-ray on both sides of the interface, and is therefore not deflected, while the s-polarized ray changes from o-ray to e-ray and is therefore deflected.
