= Micrasterias bangladeshensis =

Scientific classification
- Domain: Eukaryota
- Supergroup: Archaeplastida
- Clade: Viridiplantae
- Class: Zygnematophyceae
- Order: Desmidiales
- Family: Desmidiaceae
- Genus: Micrasterias
- Species: M. bangladeshensis

Binomial name
- Micrasterias bangladeshensis A.K.Islam & Haroon, 1980

Species of algae

Micrasterias bangladeshensis is a species of freshwater algae. It is native to Bangladesh.
