= Classical interference microscopy =

Microscopy using two separate light beams

Classical interference microscopy, also called quantitative interference microscopy, uses two separate light beams with much greater lateral separation than that used in phase contrast microscopy or in differential interference microscopy (DIC).

In variants of the interference microscope where object and reference beam pass through the same objective, two images are produced of every object (one being the "ghost image"). The two images are separated either laterally within the visual field or at different focal planes, as determined by the optical principles employed. These two images can be a nuisance when they overlap, since they can severely affect the accuracy of mass thickness measurements. Rotation of the preparation may thus be necessary, as in the case of DIC.

One of the first usable interference microscopes was designed by Dyson and manufactured by Cooke, Troughton & Simms (later Vickers Instruments) in York, England. This ingenious optical system achieved interference imaging without requiring polarizing elements in the beam path.

A later popular design involving polarizing elements was designed by Smith and marketed first by C. Baker, London, and subsequently by the American Optical Company in the United States.

The double-image problem commonly encountered with all the above-mentioned designs was completely avoided in the Mach–Zehnder interferometer design implemented by Horn, a most expensive instrument, not employing polarized light, but requiring precisely-matched duplicated objectives and condensers. With this design (marketed by E. Leitz) 60 mm beam separation was achieved in microscopy but here the new difficulty has arisen of balancing optical thicknesses of two separate microscope slide preparations (sample and dummy) and maintaining this critical balance during longer observations (e.g. time-lapse studies of living cells maintained at 37 °C), otherwise a gradual change in background interference colour occurs over time.

The main advantage offered by interference microscopy measurements is the possibility of measuring the projected dry mass of living cells, which was first effectively exploited by Andrew Huxley in studies of striated muscle cell structure and function, leading to the sliding filament model of muscle contraction.

The popularity of interference microscopy peaked around 1940–1970s and fell after that because of the complexity of the instrument and difficulties in both its use and in the interpretation of image data. In recent years, the classical interference microscope (in particular the Mach–Zehnder instrument) has been "rediscovered" by biologists because its main original disadvantage (difficult interpretation of translated interference bands or complex coloured images) can now be easily surmounted by means of digital camera image recording, followed by the application of computer algorithms that rapidly deliver the processed data as false-colour images of projected dry mass. Interference microscopy for industrial inspection, semiconductor inspection and surface structure analysis is highly developed and in widespread use.

== Instrumentation history and makers' names ==
- Smith system (C. Baker, London, England)
- Dyson (Cooke Troughton & Simms, York, England)
- Jamin-Lebedeff (E. Leitz, Wetzlar, & Zeiss, Germany)
- Mach–Zehnder (E. Leitz, Wetzlar, Germany)
