= Nanovid microscopy =

Microscopic technique using colloidal gold

Nanovid microscopy, from "nanometer video-enhanced microscopy", is a microscopic technique aimed at visualizing colloidal gold particles of 20–40 nm diameter (nanogold, immunogold) as dynamic markers at the light-microscopic level. The nanogold particles as such are smaller than the diffraction limit of light, but can be visualized by using video-enhanced differential interference contrast (VEDIC). The technique is based on the use of contrast enhancement by video techniques and digital image processing. Nanovid microscopy, by combining small colloidal gold probes with video-enhanced quantitative microscopy, allows studying the intracellular dynamics of specific proteins in living cells.

== See also ==
- Microscopy
- Single-particle tracking
- Differential interference contrast microscopy
- Microtubule
