= Glan–Taylor prism =

Improved air-spaced calcite polarizer design

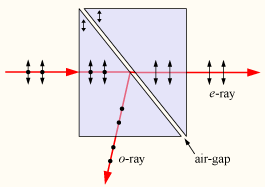
A Glan–Taylor prism reflects s-polarized light at an internal air-gap, transmitting only the p-polarized component. The optical axes are vertical in the plane of the diagram.

A Glan–Taylor prism is a type of prism which is used as a polarizer or polarizing beam splitter. It is one of the most common types of modern polarizing prism. It was first described by Archard and Taylor in 1948.

The prism is made of two right-angled prisms of calcite (or sometimes other birefringent materials) separated on their long faces with an air gap. The optical axes of the calcite crystals are aligned parallel to the plane of reflection. Total internal reflection of s-polarized light at the air gap ensures that only p-polarized light is transmitted by the device. Because the angle of incidence at the gap can be reasonably close to Brewster's angle, unwanted reflection of p-polarized light is reduced, giving the Glan–Taylor prism better transmission than the Glan–Foucault design. Note that while the transmitted beam is completely polarized, the reflected beam is not. The sides of the crystal can be polished to allow the reflected beam to exit or can be blackened to absorb it. The latter reduces unwanted Fresnel reflection of the rejected beam.

A variant of the design exists called a Glan–laser prism. This is a Glan–Taylor prism with a steeper angle for the cut in the prism, which decreases reflection loss at the expense of reduced angular field of view. These polarizers are also typically designed to tolerate very high beam intensities, such those produced by a laser. The differences may include using calcite selected for low scattering loss, improved polish quality on the faces and especially on the sides of the crystal, and better antireflection coatings. Prisms with irradiance damage thresholds greater than 1 GW/cm^{2} are commercially available.

== See also ==
- Glan–Foucault prism
- Glan–Thompson prism
