= Henri Hureau de Sénarmont =

Professor of mineralogy, School of Mines, Paris

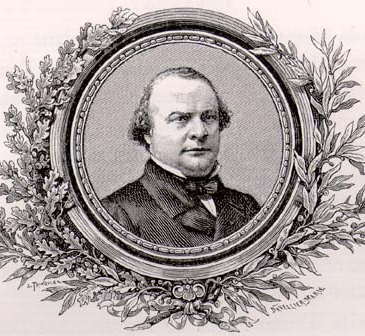
- Born: 6 September 1808; Broué, Eure-et-Loir, France
- Died: 30 June 1862 (aged 53); Paris, France
- Education: École Polytechnique; École des Mines
- Known for: research on polarization
- Scientific career
- Fields: mineralogy
- Workplaces: École des Mines

Henri Hureau de Sénarmont (French pronunciation: [ɑ̃ʁi yʁo də senaʁmɔ̃]) (6 September 1808 – 30 June 1862) was a French mineralogist and physicist.

He was born in Broué, Eure-et-Loir. From 1822 to 1826, he studied at the École Polytechnique in Paris, then furthered his education at the École des Mines. During the course of his career, he became engineer-in-chief of mines, and professor of mineralogy and director of studies at the École des Mines in Paris.

Sénarmont was distinguished for his research on polarization and demonstrating the anisotropy of heat diffusion in a crystal, and on the artificial formation of minerals. A polarized light retardation compensator known as a "Sénarmont prism polarizer" is named after him, as is senarmontite, a mineral that he described in 1851.

He wrote essays and prepared maps on the geology of Seine-et-Marne and Seine-et-Oise for the Geological Survey of France (1844). He admired the work of Augustin Fresnel, and endeavored to prepare of an entire edition of Fresnel's works. The project was far enough advanced prior to his death that it could be completed by other authors ("Oeuvres complètes d'Augustin Fresnel", 1866–70).

== See also ==
- Physical crystallography before X-rays
