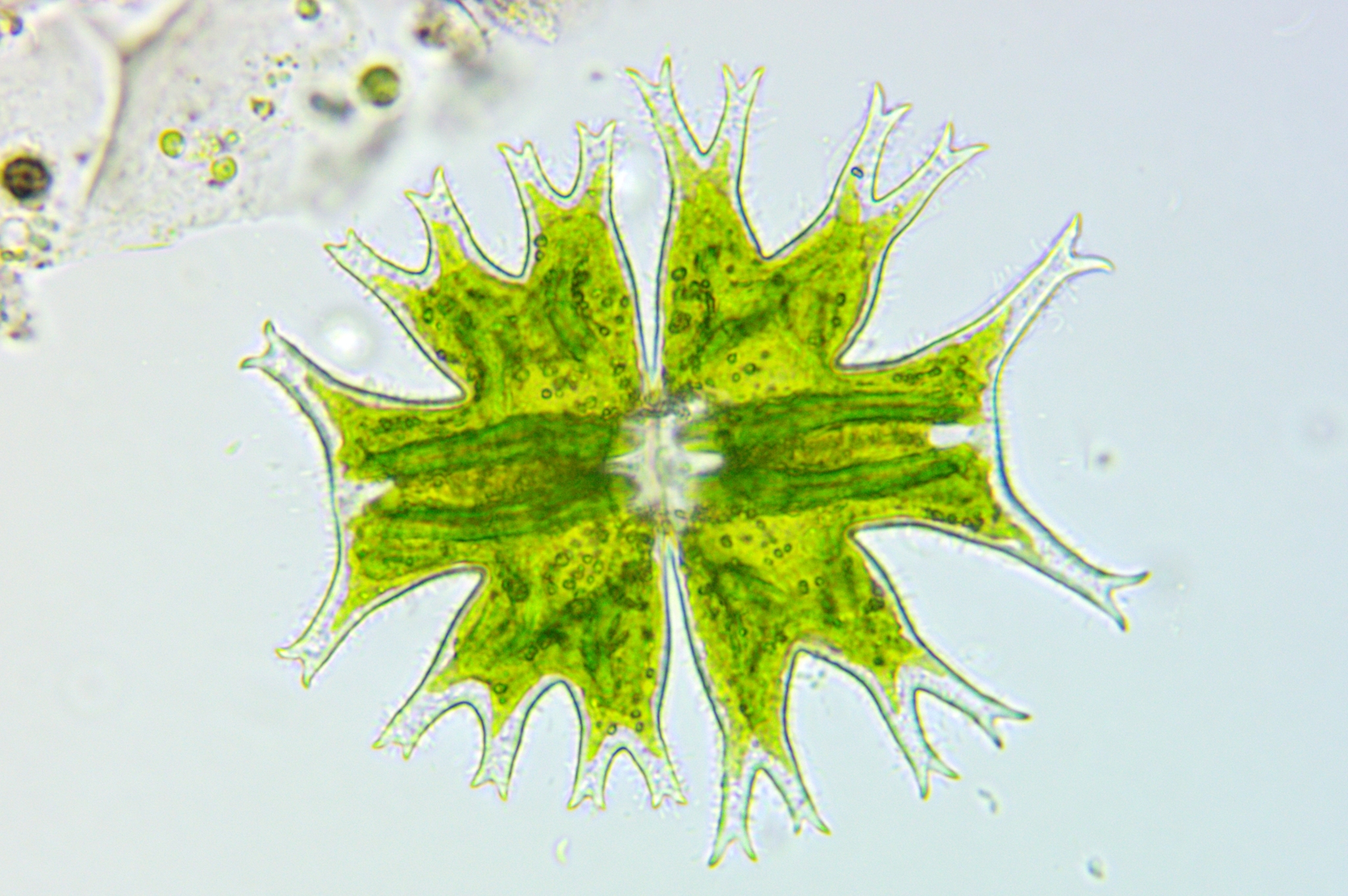

Scientific classification
- Kingdom: Plantae
- Class: Zygnematophyceae
- Order: Desmidiales
- Family: Desmidiaceae
- Genus: Micrasterias
- Species: M. furcata

Binomial name
- Micrasterias furcata C.Agardh ex Ralfs

Synonyms
- Micrasterias radiata Hassall ex W.West & G.S.West

= Micrasterias furcata =

Species of alga

Micrasterias furcata is a species of desmid, a type of alga which inhabits freshwater areas. It inhabits mesotrophic waters and has a cosmopolitan distribution.

== Naming ==
Micrasterias furcata has a somewhat complex nomenclatural history. The name was first used by Carl Adolph Agardh in 1827, and later in John Ralfs's 1848 work The British Desmidieae, he applied the name Micrasterias furcata to what is currently known as this species. Agardh's specimens correspond to what is known as Micrasterias denticulata or Micrasterias rotata. The species was described again in 1895 by Arthur Hill Hassall, as Micrasterias radiata.

According to the International Code of Botanical Nomenclature, Ralfs' 1848 work is the starting point for desmids, and so although Ralfs' name M. furcata was based on an earlier name corresponding to a different species, the name Micrasterias furcata Agardh ex Ralfs has priority over M. radaiata Hassall.

== Description ==
Micrasterias furcata is a unicellular alga consisting of cells which are strongly flattened, thus appearing narrowly spindle-shaped when viewed from the side or top. Cells are 126–250 μm long and 102–208 μm wide, roughly as long as wide. They consist two identical halves, termed semi-cells, which are joined together at the center of the cell (the isthmus) with deep sinuses separating the two semi-cells.

Each semi-cell has three deeply divided lobes, one polar and two lateral. The polar lobe has parallel sides and widens upward into two long, slender divergent extensions with small tips. The side lobes are usually divided twice (sometimes once or not at all); lobes are slender and separated by deep, wide incisions. The highest-order lobes are divergent and extend into forked tips. Each semi-cell has a single massive chloroplast, with many pyrenoids mostly in the midregions.

Micrasterias furcata is highly variable, with many varieties and formae described. The varieties differ mainly in the thickness of the lobules, the directions the lobules point in, and the degree of lobes (the number of divisions). Some forms are morphologically similar to forms of Micrasterias radians and M. crux-melitensis.
