= Glan–Foucault prism =

Type of polarizer

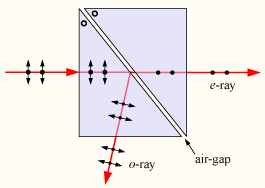
A Glan–Foucault prism deflects p-polarized light, transmitting the s-polarized component. The optical axis of the prism material is perpendicular to the plane of the diagram.

A Glan–Foucault prism (also called a Glan–air prism) is a type of prism which is used as a polarizer. It is similar in construction to a Glan–Thompson prism, except that two right-angled calcite prisms are spaced with an air gap instead of being cemented together. Total internal reflection of p-polarized light at the air gap means that only s-polarized light is transmitted straight through the prism.

== Design ==
Compared to the Glan–Thompson prism, the Glan–Foucault has a narrower acceptance angle over which it works, but because it uses an air gap rather than cement, much higher irradiances can be used without damage. The prism can thus be used with laser beams. The prism is also shorter (for a given usable aperture) than the Glan–Thompson design, and the deflection angle of the rejected beam can be made close to 90°, which is sometimes useful. Glan–Foucault prisms are not typically used as polarizing beamsplitters because while the transmitted beam is completely polarized, the reflected beam is not.

== Polarization ==
The Glan–Taylor prism is similar, except that the crystal axes and transmitted polarization direction are orthogonal to the Glan–Foucault design. This yields higher transmission and better polarization of the reflected light. Calcite Glan–Foucault prisms are now rarely used, having been mostly replaced by Glan–Taylor polarizers and other more recent designs.

Yttrium orthovanadate (YVO_{4}) prisms based on the Glan–Foucault design have superior polarization of the reflected beam and higher damage threshold, compared with calcite Glan–Foucault and Glan–Taylor prisms. YVO_{4} prisms are more expensive, however, and can accept beams over a very limited range of angles of incidence.
