= Glan–Thompson prism =

Type of polarizing prism

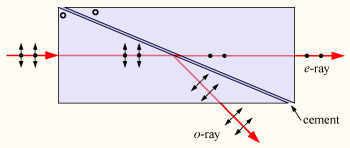
A Glan–Thompson prism deflects the p-polarized ordinary ray and transmits the s-polarized extraordinary ray. The two halves of the prism are joined with optical cement, and the crystal axes are perpendicular to the plane of the diagram. The lower red ray exiting the prism undergoes refraction, which is not shown on this diagram.

A Glan–Thompson prism is a type of polarizing prism similar to the Nicol prism and Glan–Foucault prism.

== Design ==
A Glan–Thompson prism consists of two right-angled calcite prisms that are cemented together by their long faces. The optical axes of the calcite crystals are parallel and aligned perpendicular to the plane of reflection. Birefringence splits light entering the prism into two rays, experiencing different refractive indices; the p-polarized ordinary ray is totally internally reflected from the calcite–cement interface, leaving the s-polarized extraordinary ray to be transmitted. The prism can therefore be used as a polarizing beam splitter.

Traditionally Canada balsam was used as the cement in assembling these prisms, but this has largely been replaced by synthetic polymers.

== Characteristics ==
Compared to the similar Glan–Foucault prism, the Glan–Thompson has a wider acceptance angle, but a much lower limit of maximal irradiance (due to optical damage limitations of the cement layer).

== See also ==
- Glan–Taylor prism
