= Wollaston prism =

Type of polarizer

A Wollaston prism

A Wollaston prism is an optical device, invented by William Hyde Wollaston, that manipulates polarized light. It separates light into two separate linearly polarized outgoing beams with orthogonal polarization. The two beams are polarized according to the optical axis of the two right angle prisms.

The Wollaston prism consists of two orthogonal prisms of birefringent material—typically a uniaxial material such as calcite. These prisms are cemented together on their base (traditionally with Canada balsam) to form two right triangle prisms with perpendicular optic axes. Outgoing light beams diverge from the prism as ordinary and extraordinary rays due to the differences in the indexes of refraction, with the angle of divergence determined by the prisms' wedge angle and the wavelength of the light. Commercial prisms are available with divergence angles from less than 1° to about 45°.

The spectral range of operation depends on the selected birefringent material and its transparency characteristics. Recent developments using mercurous halide crystals have demonstrated that Wollaston prisms can operate across an extended spectral range from the visible to far-infrared bands (up to 40 μm), significantly broader than traditional calcite-based prisms. Additionally, for specific prism wedge angle designs, the cemented optical interface may be replaced by an air gap, eliminating the need for optical cement bonding.

== See also ==
- Other types of polarizing prisms
