= Fresnel (disambiguation) =

Augustin-Jean Fresnel (1788–1827) was a physicist.

Fresnel may also refer to:

- Fresnel (frequency), a formerly used unit equal to one terahertz
- Rimae Fresnel, an escarpment on the moon
- Fresnel lens, a type of composite compact lens
- French submarine Fresnel, more than one submarine of the French Navy

== People with the surname ==
- Fulgence Fresnel (1795–1855), French Orientalist and brother of Augustin-Jean Fresnel
