= Fresnel rhomb =

Optical prism

Fig. 1: Cross-section of a Fresnel rhomb (blue) with graphs showing the p component of vibration (parallel to the plane of incidence) on the vertical axis, vs. the s component (square to the plane of incidence and parallel to the surface) on the horizontal axis. If the incoming light is linearly polarized, the two components are in phase (top graph). After one reflection at the appropriate angle, the p component is advanced by 1/8 of a cycle relative to the s component (middle graph). After two such reflections, the phase difference is 1/4 of a cycle (bottom graph), so that the polarization is elliptical with axes in the s and p directions. If the s and p components were initially of equal magnitude, the initial polarization (top graph) would be at 45° to the plane of incidence, and the final polarization (bottom graph) would be circular.

A Fresnel rhomb is an optical prism that introduces a 90° phase difference between two perpendicular components of polarization, by means of two total internal reflections. If the incident beam is linearly polarized at 45° to the plane of incidence and reflection, the emerging beam is circularly polarized, and vice versa. If the incident beam is linearly polarized at some other inclination, the emerging beam is elliptically polarized with one principal axis in the plane of reflection, and vice versa.

The rhomb usually takes the form of a right parallelepiped, or in other words, a solid with six parallelogram faces (a square is to a cube as a parallelogram is to a parallelepiped). If the incident ray is perpendicular to one of the smaller rectangular faces, the angle of incidence and reflection at both of the longer faces is equal to the acute angle of the parallelogram. This angle is chosen so that each reflection introduces a phase difference of 45° between the components polarized parallel and perpendicular to the plane of reflection. For a given, sufficiently high refractive index, there are two angles meeting this criterion; for example, an index of 1.5 requires an angle of 50.2° or 53.3°.

Conversely, if the angle of incidence and reflection is fixed, the phase difference introduced by the rhomb depends only on its refractive index, which typically varies only slightly over the visible spectrum. Thus the rhomb functions as if it were a wideband quarter-wave plate – in contrast to a conventional birefringent (doubly-refractive) quarter-wave plate, whose phase difference is more sensitive to the frequency (color) of the light. The material of which the rhomb is made – usually glass – is specifically not birefringent.

The Fresnel rhomb is named after its inventor, the French physicist Augustin-Jean Fresnel, who developed the device in stages between 1817 and 1823. During that time he deployed it in crucial experiments involving polarization, birefringence, and optical rotation, all of which contributed to the eventual acceptance of his transverse-wave theory of light.

== Operation ==
Incident electromagnetic waves (such as light) consist of transverse vibrations in the electric and magnetic fields; these are proportional to and at right angles to each other and may therefore be represented by (say) the electric field alone. When striking an interface, the electric field oscillations can be resolved into two perpendicular components, known as the s and p components, which are parallel to the surface and the plane of incidence, respectively; in other words, the s and p components are respectively square and parallel to the plane of incidence. (Note: The s originally comes from the German senkrecht, meaning "perpendicular" (to the plane of incidence). The alternative mnemonics in the text are perhaps more suitable for English speakers.)

Light passing through a Fresnel rhomb undergoes two total internal reflections at the same carefully chosen angle of incidence. After one such reflection, the p component is advanced by 1/8 of a cycle (45°; π/4 radians) relative to the s component. With two such reflections, a relative phase shift of 1/4 of a cycle (90°; π/2) is obtained. The word relative is critical: as the wavelength is very small compared with the dimensions of typical apparatus, the individual phase advances suffered by the s and p components are not readily observable, but the difference between them is easily observable through its effect on the state of polarization of the emerging light.

If the incoming light is linearly polarized (plane-polarized), the s and p components are initially in phase; hence, after two reflections, "the p component is 90° ahead in phase", so that the polarization of the emerging light is elliptical with principal axes in the s and p directions (Fig. 1). Similarly, if the incoming light is elliptically polarized with axes in the s and p directions, the emerging light is linearly polarized.

In the special case in which the incoming s and p components not only are in phase but also have equal magnitudes, the initial linear polarization is at 45° to the plane of incidence and reflection, and the final elliptical polarization is circular. If the circularly polarized light is inspected through an analyzer (second polarizer), it seems to have been completely "depolarized", because its observed brightness is independent of the orientation of the analyzer. But if this light is processed by a second rhomb, it is repolarized at 45° to the plane of reflection in that rhomb – a property not shared by ordinary (unpolarized) light.

== Related devices ==
For a general input polarization, the net effect of the rhomb is identical to that of a birefringent (doubly-refractive) quarter-wave plate, except that a simple birefringent plate gives the desired 90° separation at a single frequency, and not (even approximately) at widely different frequencies, whereas the phase separation given by the rhomb depends on its refractive index, which varies only slightly over a wide frequency range (see Dispersion). Two Fresnel rhombs can be used in tandem (usually cemented to avoid reflections at their interface) to achieve the function of a half-wave plate. The tandem arrangement, unlike a single Fresnel rhomb, has the additional feature that the emerging beam can be collinear with the original incident beam.

== Theory ==
In order to specify the phase shift on reflection, we must choose a sign convention for the reflection coefficient, which is the ratio of the reflected amplitude to the incident amplitude. In the case of the s components, for which the incident and reflected vibrations are both normal (perpendicular) to the plane of incidence, the obvious choice is to say that a positive reflection coefficient, corresponding to zero phase shift, is one for which the incident and reflected fields have the same direction (no reversal; no "inversion"). In the case of the p components, this article adopts the convention that a positive reflection coefficient is one for which the incident and reflected fields are inclined towards the same medium. We may then cover both cases by saying that a positive reflection coefficient is one for which the direction of the field vector normal to the plane of incidence (the electric vector for the s polarization, or the magnetic vector for the p polarization) is unchanged by the reflection. (But the reader should be warned that some authors use a different convention for the p components, with the result that the stated phase shift differs by 180° from the value given here.)

With the chosen sign convention, the phase advances on total internal reflection, for the s and p components, are respectively given by

$\delta_s = 2\arctan\frac{\sqrt{n^2\sin^2\theta_\text{i} - 1}}{n\cos\theta_\text{i}}$	1

and

$\delta_p = 2\arctan\frac{n\sqrt{n^2\sin^2\theta_\text{i} - 1}}{\cos\theta_\text{i}},$	2

where θ_{i} is the angle of incidence, and n is the refractive index of the internal (optically denser) medium relative to the external (optically rarer) medium. (Some authors, however, use the reciprocal refractive index, so that their expressions for the phase shifts look different from the above.)

Fig. 2: Phase advance at "internal" reflections for refractive indices of 1.55, 1.5, and 1.45 ("internal" relative to "external"). Beyond the critical angle, the p (red) and s (blue) polarizations undergo unequal phase shifts on total internal reflection; the macroscopically observable difference between these shifts is plotted in black.

The phase advance of the p component relative to the s component is then given by

$$\delta = \delta_{p\!} - \delta_s.$$

This is plotted in black in Fig. 2, for angles of incidence exceeding the critical angle, for three values of the refractive index. It can be seen that a refractive index of 1.45 is not enough to give a 45° phase difference, whereas a refractive index of 1.5 is enough (by a slim margin) to give a 45° phase difference at two angles of incidence: about 50.2° and 53.3°.

For θ_{i} greater than the critical angle, the phase shifts on total reflection are deduced from complex values of the reflection coefficients. For completeness, Fig. 2 also shows the phase shifts on partial reflection, for θ_{i} less than the critical angle. In the latter case, the reflection coefficients for the s and p components are real, and are conveniently expressed by Fresnel's sine law

$r_s = -\frac{\sin(\theta_\text{i} - \theta_\text{t})}{\sin(\theta_\text{i} + \theta_\text{t})},$	3

and Fresnel's tangent law

$r_p=\frac{\tan(\theta_\text{i}-\theta_\text{t})}{\tan(\theta_\text{i}+\theta_\text{t})},$	4

where θ_{i} is the angle of incidence and θ_{t} is the angle of refraction (with subscript t for transmitted), and the sign of the latter result is a function of the convention described above. (We can now see a disadvantage of that convention, namely that the two coefficients have opposite signs as we approach normal incidence; the corresponding advantage is that they have the same signs at grazing incidence.)

By Fresnel's sine law, r_{s} is positive for all angles of incidence with a transmitted ray (since θ_{t} > θ_{i} for dense-to-rare incidence), giving a phase shift δ_{s} of zero. But, by his tangent law, r_{p} is negative for small angles (that is, near normal incidence), and changes sign at Brewster's angle, where θ_{i} and θ_{t} are complementary. Thus the phase shift δ_{p} is 180° for small θ_{i} but switches to 0° at Brewster's angle. Combining the complementarity with Snell's law yields θ_{i} = arctan(1/n) as Brewster's angle for dense-to-rare incidence. (Note: The more familiar formula arctan n is for rare-to-dense incidence. In both cases, n is the refractive index of the denser medium relative to the rarer medium.)

That completes the information needed to plot δ_{s} and δ_{p} for all angles of incidence in Fig. 2, in which δ_{p} is in red and δ_{s} in blue. On the angle-of-incidence scale (horizontal axis), Brewster's angle is where δ_{p} (red) falls from 180° to 0°, and the critical angle is where both δ_{p} and δ_{s} (red and blue) start to rise again. To the left of the critical angle is the region of partial reflection; here both reflection coefficients are real (phase 0° or 180°) with magnitudes less than 1. To the right of the critical angle is the region of total reflection; there both reflection coefficients are complex with magnitudes equal to 1.

In Fig. 2, the phase difference δ is computed by a final subtraction; but there are other ways of expressing it. Fresnel himself, in 1823, gave a formula for cos δ. Born and Wolf (1970, p. 50) derive an expression for tan(δ/2), and find its maximum analytically.

(For derivations of eqs. (1) to (4) above, see Total internal reflection, especially § Derivation of evanescent wave and § Phase shifts.)

== History ==
=== Background ===
Augustin-Jean Fresnel came to the study of total internal reflection through his research on polarization. In 1811, François Arago discovered that polarized light was apparently "depolarized" in an orientation-dependent and color-dependent manner when passed through a slice of birefringent crystal: the emerging light showed colors when viewed through an analyzer (second polarizer). Chromatic polarization, as this phenomenon came to be called, was more thoroughly investigated in 1812 by Jean-Baptiste Biot. In 1813, Biot established that one case studied by Arago, namely quartz cut perpendicular to its optic axis, was actually a gradual rotation of the plane of polarization with distance. He went on to discover that certain liquids, including turpentine (térébenthine), shared this property (see Optical rotation).

In 1816, Fresnel offered his first attempt at a wave-based theory of chromatic polarization. Without (yet) explicitly invoking transverse waves, this theory treated the light as consisting of two perpendicularly polarized components.

=== Stage 1: Coupled prisms (1817) ===
In 1817, Fresnel noticed that plane-polarized light seemed to be partly depolarized by total internal reflection, if initially polarized at an acute angle to the plane of incidence. (Note: This effect had been previously discovered by David Brewster, but not yet adequately reported. See: "On a new species of moveable polarization", [Quarterly] Journal of Science and the Arts, vol. 2, no. 3, 1817, p. 213; T. Young, "Chromatics", Supplement to the Fourth, Fifth, and Sixth Editions of the Encyclopædia Britannica, vol. 3 (first half, issued February 1818), pp. 141–163, at p. 157; Lloyd, 1834, p. 368.) By including total internal reflection in a chromatic-polarization experiment, he found that the apparently depolarized light was a mixture of components polarized parallel and perpendicular to the plane of incidence, and that the total reflection introduced a phase difference between them. Choosing an appropriate angle of incidence (not yet exactly specified) gave a phase difference of 1/8 of a cycle. Two such reflections from the "parallel faces" of "two coupled prisms" gave a phase difference of 1/4 of a cycle. In that case, if the light was initially polarized at 45° to the plane of incidence and reflection, it appeared to be completely depolarized after the two reflections. These findings were reported in a memoir submitted and read to the French Academy of Sciences in November 1817.

In a "supplement" dated January 1818, Fresnel reported that optical rotation could be emulated by passing the polarized light through a pair of "coupled prisms", followed by an ordinary birefringent lamina sliced parallel to its axis, with the axis at 45° to the plane of reflection of the prisms, followed by a second pair of prisms at 90° to the first. This was the first experimental evidence of a mathematical relation between optical rotation and birefringence.

=== Stage 2: Parallelepiped (1818) ===
The memoir of November 1817 bears the undated marginal note: "I have since replaced these two coupled prisms by a parallelepiped in glass." A dated reference to the parallelepiped form – the form that we would now recognize as a Fresnel rhomb – is found in a memoir which Fresnel read to the Academy on 30 March 1818, and which was subsequently lost until 1846. In that memoir, Fresnel reported that if polarized light was fully "depolarized" by a rhomb, its properties were not further modified by a subsequent passage through an optically rotating medium, whether that medium was a crystal or a liquid or even his own emulator; for example, the light retained its ability to be repolarized by a second rhomb.

=== Interlude (1818–1822) ===
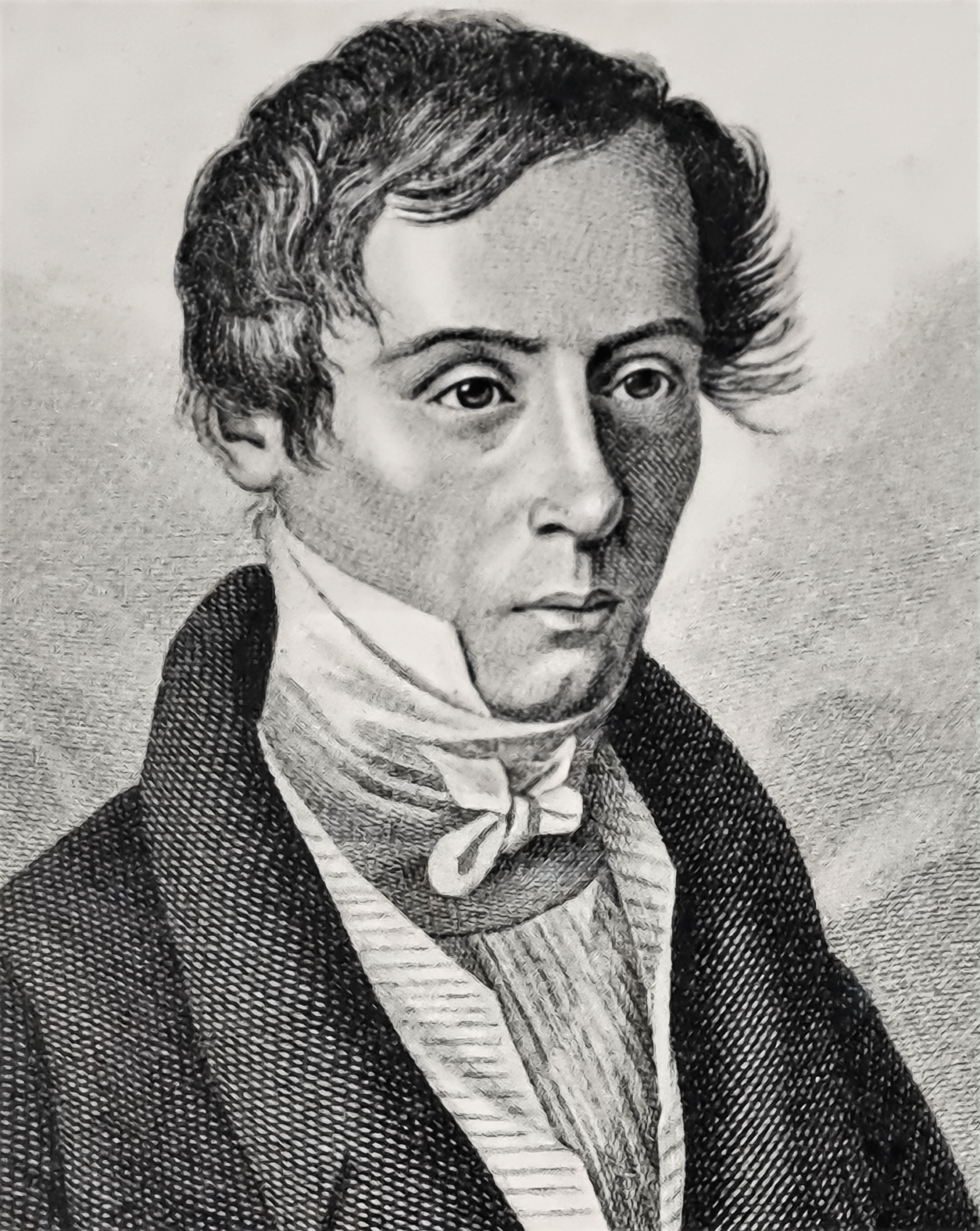
Augustin-Jean Fresnel (1788–1827)

As an engineer of bridges and roads, and as a proponent of the wave theory of light, Fresnel was still an outsider to the physics establishment when he presented his parallelepiped in March 1818. But he was increasingly difficult to ignore. In April 1818 he claimed priority for the Fresnel integrals. In July he submitted the great memoir on diffraction that immortalized his name in elementary physics textbooks. In 1819 came the announcement of the prize for the memoir on diffraction, the publication of the Fresnel–Arago laws, and the presentation of Fresnel's proposal to install "stepped lenses" in lighthouses.

In 1821, Fresnel derived formulae equivalent to his sine and tangent laws (Eqs. (3) and (4), above) by modeling light waves as transverse elastic waves with vibrations perpendicular to what had previously been called the plane of polarization. (Note: Hence, where Fresnel says that after total internal reflection at the appropriate incidence, the wave polarized parallel to the plane of incidence is "behind" by 1/8 of a cycle (quoted by Buchwald, 1989, p. 381), he refers to the wave whose plane of polarization is parallel to the plane of incidence, i.e. the wave whose vibration is perpendicular to that plane, i.e. what we now call the s component.) Using old experimental data, he promptly confirmed that the equations correctly predicted the direction of polarization of the reflected beam when the incident beam was polarized at 45° to the plane of incidence, for light incident from air onto glass or water. The experimental confirmation was reported in a "postscript" to the work in which Fresnel expounded his mature theory of chromatic polarization, introducing transverse waves. Details of the derivation were given later, in a memoir read to the academy in January 1823. The derivation combined conservation of energy with continuity of the tangential vibration at the interface, but failed to allow for any condition on the normal component of vibration. (The first derivation from electromagnetic principles was given by Hendrik Lorentz in 1875.)

Meanwhile, by April 1822, Fresnel accounted for the directions and polarizations of the refracted rays in birefringent crystals of the biaxial class – a feat that won the admiration of Pierre-Simon Laplace.

=== Use in experiments (1822–1823) ===
In a memoir on stress-induced birefringence (now called photoelasticity) read in September 1822, Fresnel reported an experiment involving a row of glass prisms with their refracting angles in alternating directions, and with two half-prisms at the ends, making the whole assembly rectangular. When the prisms facing the same way were compressed in a vise, objects viewed through the length of the assembly appeared double. At the end of this memoir he proposed a variation of the experiment, involving a Fresnel rhomb, for the purpose of verifying that optical rotation is a form of birefringence: he predicted that if the compressed glass prisms were replaced by (unstressed) monocrystalline quartz prisms with the same direction of optical rotation and with their optic axes aligned along the row, an object seen by looking along the common optic axis would give two images, which would seem unpolarized if viewed through an analyzer alone; but if viewed through a Fresnel rhomb, they would be polarized at ±45° to the plane of reflection.

Confirmation of this prediction was reported in a memoir read in December 1822, in which Fresnel coined the terms linear polarization, circular polarization, and elliptical polarization. In the experiment, the Fresnel rhomb revealed that the two images were circularly polarized in opposite directions, and the separation of the images showed that the different (circular) polarizations propagated at different speeds. To obtain a visible separation, Fresnel needed only one 14°–152°–14° prism and two half-prisms. He found, however, that the separation was improved if the glass half-prisms were replaced by quartz half-prisms whose direction of optical rotation was opposite to that of the 14°–152°–14° prism.

Thus, although we now think of the Fresnel rhomb primarily as a device for converting between linear and circular polarization, it was not until the memoir of December 1822 that Fresnel himself could describe it in those terms.

In the same memoir, Fresnel explained optical rotation by noting that linearly-polarized light could be resolved into two circularly-polarized components rotating in opposite directions. If these components propagated at slightly different speeds (as he had demonstrated for quartz), then the phase difference between them – and therefore the orientation of their linearly-polarized resultant – would vary continuously with distance.

=== Stage 3: Calculation of angles (1823) ===
The concept of circular polarization was useful in the memoir of January 1823, containing the detailed derivations of the sine and tangent laws: in that same memoir, Fresnel found that for angles of incidence greater than the critical angle, the resulting reflection coefficients were complex with unit magnitude. Noting that the magnitude represented the amplitude ratio as usual, he guessed that the argument represented the phase shift, and verified the hypothesis by experiment. The verification involved

- calculating the angle of incidence that would introduce a total phase difference of 90° between the s and p components, for various numbers of total internal reflections at that angle (generally there were two solutions),
- subjecting light to that number of total internal reflections at that angle of incidence, with an initial linear polarization at 45° to the plane of incidence, and
- checking that the final polarization was circular.

This procedure was necessary because, with the technology of the time, one could not measure the s and p phase-shifts directly, and one could not measure an arbitrary degree of ellipticality of polarization, such as might be caused by the difference between the phase shifts. But one could verify that the polarization was circular, because the brightness of the light was then insensitive to the orientation of the analyzer.

For glass with a refractive index of 1.51, Fresnel calculated that a 45° phase difference between the two reflection coefficients (hence a 90° difference after two reflections) required an angle of incidence of 48°37' or 54°37'. He cut a rhomb to the latter angle and found that it performed as expected. Thus the specification of the Fresnel rhomb was completed.

Similarly, Fresnel calculated and verified the angle of incidence that would give a 90° phase difference after three reflections at the same angle, and four reflections at the same angle. In each case there were two solutions, and in each case he reported that the larger angle of incidence gave an accurate circular polarization (for an initial linear polarization at 45° to the plane of reflection). For the case of three reflections he also tested the smaller angle, but found that it gave some coloration due to the proximity of the critical angle and its slight dependence on wavelength. (Compare Fig. 2 above, which shows that the phase difference δ is more sensitive to the refractive index for smaller angles of incidence.)

For added confidence, Fresnel predicted and verified that four total internal reflections at 68°27' would give an accurate circular polarization if two of the reflections had water as the external medium while the other two had air, but not if the reflecting surfaces were all wet or all dry.

=== Significance ===
In summary, the invention of the rhomb was not a single event in Fresnel's career, but a process spanning a large part of it. Arguably, the calculation of the phase shift on total internal reflection marked not only the completion of his theory of the rhomb, but also the essential completion of his reconstruction of physical optics on the transverse-wave hypothesis (see Augustin-Jean Fresnel).

The calculation of the phase shift was also a landmark in the application of complex numbers. Leonhard Euler had pioneered the use of complex exponents in solutions of ordinary differential equations, on the understanding that the real part of the solution was the relevant part. But Fresnel's treatment of total internal reflection seems to have been the first occasion on which a physical meaning was attached to the argument of a complex number. According to Salomon Bochner,

We think that this was the first time that complex numbers or any other mathematical objects which are "nothing-but-symbols" were put into the center of an interpretative context of "reality", and it is an extraordinary fact that this interpretation, although the first of its kind, stood up so well to verification by experiment and to the later "maxwellization" of the entire theory. In very loose terms one can say that this was the first time in which "nature" was abstracted from "pure" mathematics, that is from a mathematics which had not been previously abstracted from nature itself.

== See also ==
- Brewster's Angle
- Circular polarization
- Elliptical polarization
- Fresnel equations
- Linear polarization
- Optical rotation
- Polarization (waves)
- Polarization rotator
- Total internal reflection
- Frenzal Rhomb
- Waveplates

== Bibliography ==
- S. Bochner (June 1963), "The significance of some basic mathematical conceptions for physics", Isis, vol. 54, no. 2, pp. 179–205; jstor.org/stable/228537.
- M. Born and E. Wolf, 1970, Principles of Optics, 4th ed., Oxford: Pergamon Press.
- J. Z. Buchwald, 1989, The Rise of the Wave Theory of Light: Optical Theory and Experiment in the Early Nineteenth Century, University of Chicago Press, ISBN 0-226-07886-8.
- O. Darrigol, 2012, A History of Optics: From Greek Antiquity to the Nineteenth Century, Oxford, ISBN 978-0-19-964437-7.
- A. Fresnel, 1866 (ed. H. de Senarmont, E. Verdet, and L. Fresnel), Oeuvres complètes d'Augustin Fresnel, Paris: Imprimerie Impériale (3 vols., 1866–1870), vol. 1 (1866) (in French).
- E. Hecht, 2002, Optics, 4th ed., Addison Wesley, ISBN 0-321-18878-0.
- F. A. Jenkins and H. E. White, 1976, Fundamentals of Optics, 4th ed., New York: McGraw-Hill, ISBN 0-07-032330-5.
- N. Kipnis, 1991, History of the Principle of Interference of Light, Basel: Birkhäuser, ISBN 978-3-0348-9717-4.
- H. Lloyd, 1834, "Report on the progress and present state of physical optics", Report of the Fourth Meeting of the British Association for the Advancement of Science (held at Edinburgh in 1834), London: J. Murray, 1835, pp. 295–413.
- J. A. Stratton, 1941, Electromagnetic Theory, New York: McGraw-Hill.
- W. Whewell, 1857, History of the Inductive Sciences: From the Earliest to the Present Time, 3rd ed., London: J. W. Parker & Son, vol. 2.
- E. T. Whittaker, 1910, A History of the Theories of Aether and Electricity: From the Age of Descartes to the Close of the Nineteenth Century, London: Longmans, Green, & Co.
