= Fresnel equations =

Equations of light transmission and reflection

Partial transmission and reflection of a pulse travelling from a low to a high refractive index medium

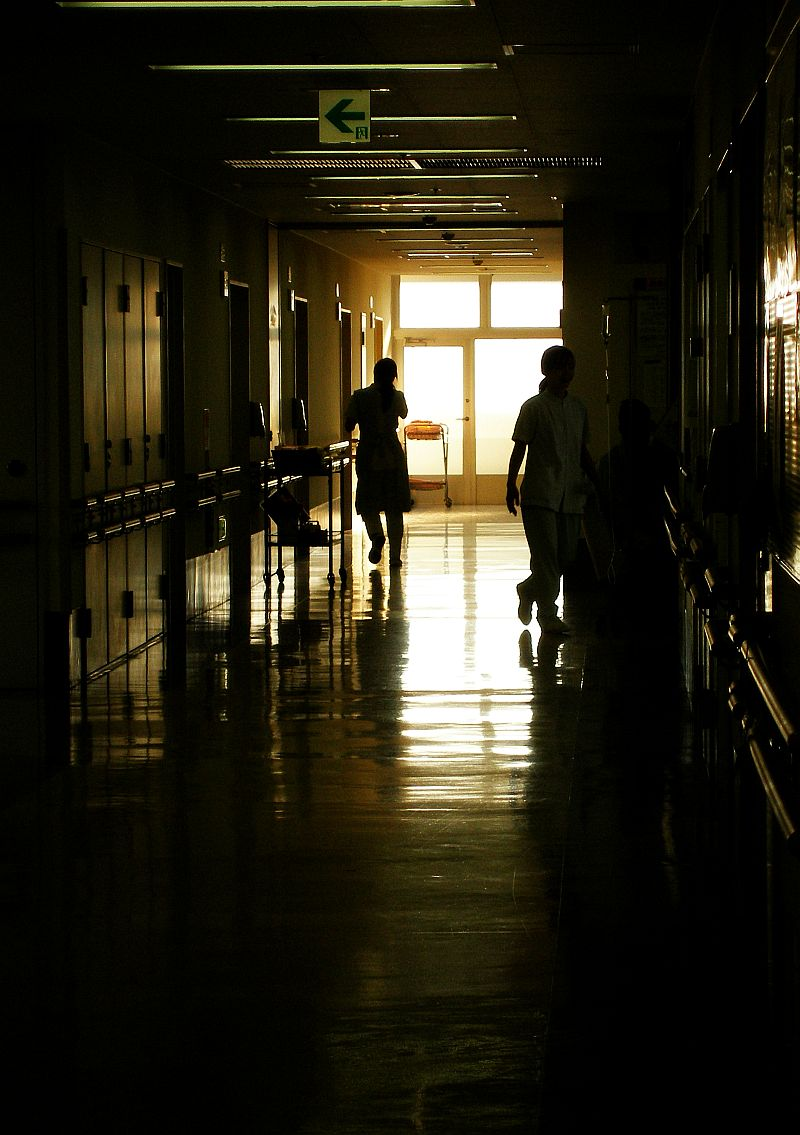
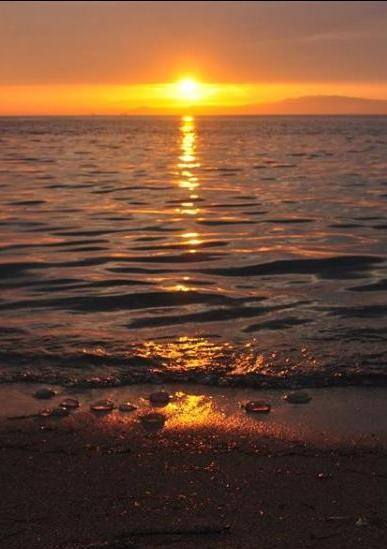
At near-grazing incidence, media interfaces appear mirror-like especially due to reflection of the s polarization, despite being poor reflectors at normal incidence. Polarized sunglasses block the s polarization, greatly reducing glare from horizontal surfaces.

The Fresnel equations (or Fresnel coefficients) describe the reflection and transmission of light (or electromagnetic radiation in general) when incident on an interface between different optical media. They were deduced by French engineer and physicist Augustin-Jean Fresnel (/freɪˈnɛl/) who was the first to understand that light is a transverse wave, when no one realized that the waves were electric and magnetic fields. For the first time, polarization could be understood quantitatively, as Fresnel's equations correctly predicted the differing behaviour of waves of the s and p polarizations incident upon a material interface.

== Overview ==
When light strikes the interface between a medium with refractive index n_{1} and a second medium with refractive index n_{2}, both reflection and refraction of the light may occur. The Fresnel equations give the ratio of the reflected wave's electric field to the incident wave's electric field, and the ratio of the transmitted wave's electric field to the incident wave's electric field, for each of two components of polarization. (The magnetic fields can also be related using similar coefficients.) These ratios are generally complex, describing not only the relative amplitudes but also the phase shifts at the interface.

The equations assume the interface between the media is flat and that the media are homogeneous and isotropic. The incident light is assumed to be a plane wave, which is sufficient to solve any problem since any incident light field can be decomposed into plane waves and polarizations.

=== S and P polarizations ===
The plane of incidence is defined by the incoming radiation's propagation vector and the normal vector of the surface.

There are two sets of Fresnel coefficients for two different linear polarization components of the incident wave. Since any polarization state can be resolved into a combination of two orthogonal linear polarizations, this is sufficient for any problem. Likewise, unpolarized (or "randomly polarized") light has an equal amount of power in each of two linear polarizations.

The s polarization refers to polarization of a wave's electric field normal to the plane of incidence (the z direction in the derivation below); then the magnetic field is in the plane of incidence. The p polarization refers to polarization of the electric field in the plane of incidence (the xy plane in the derivation below); then the magnetic field is normal to the plane of incidence. The names "s" and "p" for the polarization components refer to German "senkrecht" (perpendicular or normal) and "parallel" (parallel to the plane of incidence).

Although the reflection and transmission are dependent on polarization, at normal incidence (θ = 0) there is no distinction between them so all polarization states are governed by a single set of Fresnel coefficients (and another special case is mentioned below in which that is true).

== Configuration ==
Variables used in the Fresnel equations

In the diagram, an incident plane wave in the direction of the ray IO strikes the interface between two media of refractive indices n_{1} and n_{2} at point O. Part of the wave is reflected in the direction OR, and part refracted in the direction OT. The angles that the incident, reflected and refracted rays make to the normal of the interface are given as θ_{i}, θ_{r} and θ_{t}, respectively. The relationship between these angles is given by the law of reflection:
$$\theta_\mathrm{i} = \theta_\mathrm{r},$$
and Snell's law:
$$n_1 \sin \theta_\mathrm{i} = n_2 \sin \theta_\mathrm{t}.$$

The behavior of light striking the interface is explained by considering the electric and magnetic fields that constitute an electromagnetic wave, and the laws of electromagnetism, as shown below. The ratio of waves' electric field (or magnetic field) amplitudes are obtained, but in practice one is more often interested in formulae which determine power coefficients, since power (or irradiance) is what can be directly measured at optical frequencies. The power of a wave is generally proportional to the square of the electric (or magnetic) field amplitude.

== Power (intensity) reflection and transmission coefficients ==
Power coefficients: air to glass

Power coefficients: glass to air (Total internal reflection starts from 42° making reflection coefficient 1)

We call the fraction of the incident power that is reflected from the interface the reflectance (or reflectivity, or power reflection coefficient) R, and the fraction that is refracted into the second medium is called the transmittance (or transmissivity, or power transmission coefficient) T. Note that these are what would be measured right at each side of an interface and do not account for attenuation of a wave in an absorbing medium following transmission or reflection.

The reflectance for s-polarized light is
$$R_\mathrm{s} = \left|\frac{Z_2 \cos \theta_\mathrm{i} - Z_1 \cos \theta_\mathrm{t}}{Z_2 \cos \theta_\mathrm{i} + Z_1 \cos \theta_\mathrm{t}}\right|^2,$$
while the reflectance for p-polarized light is
$$R_\mathrm{p} = \left|\frac{Z_2 \cos \theta_\mathrm{t} - Z_1 \cos \theta_\mathrm{i}}{Z_2 \cos \theta_\mathrm{t} + Z_1 \cos \theta_\mathrm{i}}\right|^2,$$
where Z_{1} and Z_{2} are the wave impedances of media 1 and 2, respectively.

We assume that the media are non-magnetic (i.e., μ_{1} = μ_{2} = μ_{0}), which is typically a good approximation at optical frequencies (and for transparent media at other frequencies). Then the wave impedances are determined solely by the refractive indices n_{1} and n_{2}:
$$Z_i = \frac{Z_0}{n_i}\,,$$
where Z_{0} is the impedance of free space and i = 1, 2. Making this substitution, we obtain equations using the refractive indices:
$$R_\mathrm{s} = \left|\frac{n_1 \cos \theta_\mathrm{i} - n_2 \cos \theta_\mathrm{t}}{n_1 \cos \theta_\mathrm{i} + n_2 \cos \theta_\mathrm{t}}\right|^2
= \left|\frac
{n_1 \cos \theta_{\mathrm{i}} - n_2 \sqrt{1 - \left(\frac{n_1}{n_2} \sin \theta_{\mathrm{i}}\right)^2}}
{n_1 \cos \theta_{\mathrm{i}} + n_2 \sqrt{1 - \left(\frac{n_1}{n_2} \sin \theta_{\mathrm{i}}\right)^2}}
\right|^2\!,$$
$$R_\mathrm{p} = \left|\frac{n_1 \cos \theta_\mathrm{t} - n_2 \cos \theta_\mathrm{i}}{n_1 \cos \theta_\mathrm{t} + n_2 \cos \theta_\mathrm{i}}\right|^2
= \left|\frac
{n_1 \sqrt{1 - \left(\frac{n_1}{n_2} \sin \theta_\mathrm{i}\right)^2} - n_2 \cos \theta_\mathrm{i}}
{n_1 \sqrt{1 - \left(\frac{n_1}{n_2} \sin \theta_\mathrm{i}\right)^2} + n_2 \cos \theta_\mathrm{i}}
\right|^2\!.$$

The second form of each equation is derived from the first by eliminating θ_{t} using Snell's law and trigonometric identities.

As a consequence of conservation of energy, one can find the transmitted power (or more correctly, irradiance: power per unit area) simply as the portion of the incident power that isn't reflected:
$$T_\mathrm{s} = 1 - R_\mathrm{s}$$
and
$$T_\mathrm{p} = 1 - R_\mathrm{p}$$

Note that all such intensities are measured in terms of a wave's irradiance in the direction normal to the interface; this is also what is measured in typical experiments. That number could be obtained from irradiances in the direction of an incident or reflected wave (given by the magnitude of a wave's Poynting vector) multiplied by cos θ for a wave at an angle θ to the normal direction (or equivalently, taking the dot product of the Poynting vector with the unit vector normal to the interface). This complication can be ignored in the case of the reflection coefficient, since cos θ_{i} = cos θ_{r}, so that the ratio of reflected to incident irradiance in the wave's direction is the same as in the direction normal to the interface.

Although these relationships describe the basic physics, in many practical applications one is concerned with "natural light" that can be described as unpolarized. That means that there is an equal amount of power in the s and p polarizations, so that the effective reflectivity of the material is just the average of the two reflectivities:
$$R_\mathrm{eff} = \frac{1}{2}\left(R_\mathrm{s} + R_\mathrm{p}\right).$$

For low-precision applications involving unpolarized light, such as computer graphics, rather than rigorously computing the effective reflection coefficient for each angle, Schlick's approximation is often used.

=== Special cases ===
==== Normal incidence ====
For the case of normal incidence, θ_{i} = θ_{t} = 0, and there is no distinction between s and p polarization. Thus, the reflectance simplifies to
$$R_0 = \left|\frac{n_1  - n_2 }{n_1 + n_2 }\right|^2\,.$$

For common glass (n_{2} ≈ 1.5) surrounded by air (n_{1} = 1), the power reflectance at normal incidence can be seen to be about 4%, or 8% accounting for both sides of a glass pane.

==== Brewster's angle ====
At a dielectric interface from n_{1} to n_{2}, there is a particular angle of incidence at which R_{p} goes to zero and a p-polarised incident wave is purely refracted, thus all reflected light is s-polarised. This angle is known as Brewster's angle, and is around 56° for n_{1} = 1 and n_{2} = 1.5 (typical glass).

==== Total internal reflection ====
When light travelling in a denser medium strikes the surface of a less dense medium (i.e., n_{1} > n_{2}), beyond a particular incidence angle known as the critical angle, all light is reflected and R_{s} = R_{p} = 1. This phenomenon, known as total internal reflection, occurs at incidence angles for which Snell's law predicts that the sine of the angle of refraction would exceed unity (whereas in fact sin θ ≤ 1 for all real θ). For glass with n = 1.5 surrounded by air, the critical angle is approximately 42°.

==== 45° incidence ====
Reflection at 45° incidence is very commonly used for making 90° turns. For the case of light traversing from a less dense medium into a denser one at 45° incidence (θ = 45°), it follows algebraically from the above equations that R_{p} equals the square of R_{s}:
$$R_\text{p} = R_\text{s}^2$$

This can be used to either verify the consistency of the measurements of R_{s} and R_{p}, or to derive one of them when the other is known. This relationship is only valid for the simple case of a single plane interface between two homogeneous materials, not for films on substrates, where a more complex analysis is required.

Measurements of R_{s} and R_{p} at 45° can be used to estimate the reflectivity at normal incidence. The "average of averages" obtained by calculating first the arithmetic as well as the geometric average of R_{s} and R_{p}, and then averaging these two averages again arithmetically, gives a value for R_{0} with an error of less than about 3% for most common optical materials. This is useful because measurements at normal incidence can be difficult to achieve in an experimental setup since the incoming beam and the detector will obstruct each other. However, since the dependence of R_{s} and R_{p} on the angle of incidence for angles below 10° is very small, a measurement at about 5° will usually be a good approximation for normal incidence, while allowing for a separation of the incoming and reflected beam.

== Complex amplitude reflection and transmission coefficients ==
The above equations relating powers (which could be measured with a photometer for instance) are derived from the Fresnel equations which solve the physical problem in terms of electromagnetic field complex amplitudes, i.e., considering phase shifts in addition to their amplitudes. Those underlying equations supply generally complex-valued ratios of those EM fields and may take several different forms, depending on the formalism used. The complex amplitude coefficients for reflection and transmission are usually represented by lower case r and t (whereas the power coefficients are capitalized). As before, we are assuming the magnetic permeability, µ of both media to be equal to the permeability of free space µ_{0} as is essentially true of all dielectrics at optical frequencies.

Amplitude coefficients: air to glass

Amplitude coefficients: glass to air

In the following equations and graphs, we adopt the following conventions. For s polarization, the reflection coefficient r is defined as the ratio of the reflected wave's complex electric field amplitude to that of the incident wave, whereas for p polarization r is the ratio of the waves complex magnetic field amplitudes (or equivalently, the negative of the ratio of their electric field amplitudes). The transmission coefficient t is the ratio of the transmitted wave's complex electric field amplitude to that of the incident wave, for either polarization. The coefficients r and t are generally different between the s and p polarizations, and even at normal incidence (where the designations s and p do not even apply!) the sign of r is reversed depending on whether the wave is considered to be s or p polarized, an artifact of the adopted sign convention (see graph for an air-glass interface at 0° incidence).

The equations consider a plane wave incident on a plane interface at angle of incidence $\theta_\mathrm{i}$, a wave reflected at angle $\theta_\mathrm{r} = \theta_\mathrm{i}$, and a wave transmitted at angle $\theta_\mathrm{t}$. In the case of an interface into an absorbing material (where n is complex) or total internal reflection, the angle of transmission does not generally evaluate to a real number. In that case, however, meaningful results can be obtained using formulations of these relationships in which trigonometric functions and geometric angles are avoided; the inhomogeneous waves launched into the second medium cannot be described using a single propagation angle.

Using this convention,
$$\begin{align}
r_\text{s} &= \frac{  n_1 \cos \theta_\text{i} - n_2 \cos \theta_\text{t}}{n_1 \cos \theta_\text{i} + n_2 \cos \theta_\text{t}}, \\[3pt]
t_\text{s} &= \frac{2 n_1 \cos \theta_\text{i}}                           {n_1 \cos \theta_\text{i} + n_2 \cos \theta_\text{t}}, \\[3pt]
r_\text{p} &= \frac{  n_2 \cos \theta_\text{i} - n_1 \cos \theta_\text{t}}{n_2 \cos \theta_\text{i} + n_1 \cos \theta_\text{t}}, \\[3pt]
t_\text{p} &= \frac{2 n_1 \cos \theta_\text{i}}                           {n_2 \cos \theta_\text{i} + n_1 \cos \theta_\text{t}}.
\end{align}$$

For the case where the magnetic permeabilities are non-negligible, the equations change such that every appearance of $n_i$ is replaced by $n_i/\mu_i$ (for both $i=1, 2$).

One can see that t_{s} = r_{s} + 1 and n_{2}/n_{1}t_{p} = r_{p} + 1. One can write very similar equations applying to the ratio of the waves' magnetic fields, but comparison of the electric fields is more conventional.

Because the reflected and incident waves propagate in the same medium and make the same angle with the normal to the surface, the power reflection coefficient R is just the squared magnitude of r:
$$R = |r|^2.$$

On the other hand, calculation of the power transmission coefficient T is less straightforward, since the light travels in different directions in the two media. What's more, the wave impedances in the two media differ; power (irradiance) is given by the square of the electric field amplitude divided by the characteristic impedance of the medium (or by the square of the magnetic field multiplied by the characteristic impedance). This results in:
$$T = \frac{n_2 \cos \theta_\text{t}}{n_1 \cos \theta_\text{i}} |t|^2$$
using the above definition of t. The introduced factor of n_{2}/n_{1} is the reciprocal of the ratio of the media's wave impedances. The cos(θ) factors adjust the waves' powers so they are reckoned in the direction normal to the interface, for both the incident and transmitted waves, so that full power transmission corresponds to T = 1.

In the case of total internal reflection where the power transmission T is zero, t nevertheless describes the electric field (including its phase) just beyond the interface. This is an evanescent field which does not propagate as a wave (thus T = 0) but has nonzero values very close to the interface. The phase shift of the reflected wave on total internal reflection can similarly be obtained from the phase angles of r_{p} and r_{s} (whose magnitudes are unity in this case). These phase shifts are different for s and p waves, which is the well-known principle by which total internal reflection is used to effect polarization transformations.

=== Alternative forms ===
In the above formula for r_{s}, if we put $n_2=n_1\sin\theta_\text{i}/\sin\theta_\text{t}$ (Snell's law) and multiply the numerator and denominator by 1/n_{1} sin θ_{t}, we obtain
$$r_\text{s}=-\frac{\sin(\theta_\text{i}-\theta_\text{t})}{\sin(\theta_\text{i}+\theta_\text{t})}.$$

If we do likewise with the formula for r_{p}, the result is easily shown to be equivalent to
$$r_\text{p}=\frac{\tan(\theta_\text{i}-\theta_\text{t})}{\tan(\theta_\text{i}+\theta_\text{t})}.$$

These formulas are known respectively as Fresnel's sine law and Fresnel's tangent law. Although at normal incidence these expressions reduce to 0/0, one can see that they yield the correct results in the limit as θ_{i} → 0.

== Multiple surfaces ==
When light makes multiple reflections between two or more parallel surfaces, the multiple beams of light generally interfere with one another, resulting in net transmission and reflection amplitudes that depend on the light's wavelength. The interference, however, is seen only when the surfaces are at distances comparable to or smaller than the light's coherence length, which for ordinary white light is few micrometers; it can be much larger for light from a laser.

An example of interference between reflections is the iridescent colours seen in a soap bubble or in thin oil films on water. Applications include Fabry–Pérot interferometers, antireflection coatings, and optical filters. A quantitative analysis of these effects is based on the Fresnel equations, but with additional calculations to account for interference.

The transfer-matrix method, or Rouard's recursive method can be used to solve multiple-surface problems.

== History ==
In 1808, Étienne-Louis Malus discovered that when a ray of light was reflected off a non-metallic surface at the appropriate angle, it behaved like one of the two rays emerging from a doubly-refractive calcite crystal. He later coined the term polarization to describe this behavior. In 1815, the dependence of the polarizing angle on the refractive index was determined experimentally by David Brewster. But the reason for that dependence was such a deep mystery that in late 1817, Thomas Young was moved to write:

[T]he great difficulty of all, which is to assign a sufficient reason for the reflection or nonreflection of a polarised ray, will probably long remain, to mortify the vanity of an ambitious philosophy, completely unresolved by any theory.

In 1821, however, Augustin-Jean Fresnel derived results equivalent to his sine and tangent laws (above), by modeling light waves as transverse elastic waves with vibrations perpendicular to what had previously been called the plane of polarization. Fresnel promptly confirmed by experiment that the equations correctly predicted the direction of polarization of the reflected beam when the incident beam was polarized at 45° to the plane of incidence, for light incident from air onto glass or water; in particular, the equations gave the correct polarization at Brewster's angle. The experimental confirmation was reported in a "postscript" to the work in which Fresnel first revealed his theory that light waves, including "unpolarized" waves, were purely transverse.

Details of Fresnel's derivation, including the modern forms of the sine law and tangent law, were given later, in a memoir read to the French Academy of Sciences in January 1823. That derivation combined conservation of energy with continuity of the tangential vibration at the interface, but failed to allow for any condition on the normal component of vibration. The first derivation from electromagnetic principles was given by Hendrik Lorentz in 1875.

In the same memoir of January 1823, Fresnel found that for angles of incidence greater than the critical angle, his formulas for the reflection coefficients (r_{s} and r_{p}) gave complex values with unit magnitudes. Noting that the magnitude, as usual, represented the ratio of peak amplitudes, he guessed that the argument represented the phase shift, and verified the hypothesis experimentally. The verification involved

- calculating the angle of incidence that would introduce a total phase difference of 90° between the s and p components, for various numbers of total internal reflections at that angle (generally there were two solutions),
- subjecting light to that number of total internal reflections at that angle of incidence, with an initial linear polarization at 45° to the plane of incidence, and
- checking that the final polarization was circular.

Thus he finally had a quantitative theory for what we now call the Fresnel rhomb — a device that he had been using in experiments, in one form or another, since 1817 (see Fresnel rhomb § History).

The success of the complex reflection coefficient inspired James MacCullagh and Augustin-Louis Cauchy, beginning in 1836, to analyze reflection from metals by using the Fresnel equations with a complex refractive index.

Four weeks before he presented his completed theory of total internal reflection and the rhomb, Fresnel submitted a memoir in which he introduced the needed terms linear polarization, circular polarization, and elliptical polarization, and in which he explained optical rotation as a species of birefringence: linearly-polarized light can be resolved into two circularly-polarized components rotating in opposite directions, and if these propagate at different speeds, the phase difference between them — hence the orientation of their linearly-polarized resultant — will vary continuously with distance.

Thus Fresnel's interpretation of the complex values of his reflection coefficients marked the confluence of several streams of his research and, arguably, the essential completion of his reconstruction of physical optics on the transverse-wave hypothesis (see Augustin-Jean Fresnel).

== Derivation ==
Here we systematically derive the above relations from electromagnetic premises.

=== Material parameters ===
In order to compute meaningful Fresnel coefficients, we must assume that the medium is (approximately) linear and homogeneous. If the medium is also isotropic, the four field vectors E, B, D, H are related by
$$\begin{align}
\mathbf{D} &= \epsilon \mathbf{E} \\
\mathbf{B} &= \mu \mathbf{H}\,,
\end{align}$$
where ϵ and μ are scalars, known respectively as the (electric) permittivity and the (magnetic) permeability of the medium. For vacuum, these have the values ϵ_{0} and μ_{0}, respectively. Hence we define the relative permittivity (or dielectric constant) ϵ_{rel} = ϵ/ϵ_{0}, and the relative permeability μ_{rel} = μ/μ_{0}.

In optics it is common to assume that the medium is non-magnetic, so that μ_{rel} = 1. For ferromagnetic materials at radio/microwave frequencies, larger values of μ_{rel} must be taken into account. But, for optically transparent media, and for all other materials at optical frequencies (except possible metamaterials), μ_{rel} is indeed very close to 1; that is, μ ≈ μ_{0}.

In optics, one usually knows the refractive index n of the medium, which is the ratio of the speed of light in vacuum (c) to the speed of light in the medium. In the analysis of partial reflection and transmission, one is also interested in the electromagnetic wave impedance Z, which is the ratio of the amplitude of E to the amplitude of H. It is therefore desirable to express n and Z in terms of ϵ and μ, and thence to relate Z to n. The last-mentioned relation, however, will make it convenient to derive the reflection coefficients in terms of the wave admittance Y, which is the reciprocal of the wave impedance Z.

In the case of uniform plane sinusoidal waves, the wave impedance or admittance is known as the intrinsic impedance or admittance of the medium. This case is the one for which the Fresnel coefficients are to be derived.

=== Electromagnetic plane waves ===
In a uniform plane sinusoidal electromagnetic wave, the electric field E has the form

$\mathbf{E_k}e^{i(\mathbf{k\cdot r}-\omega t)},$	1

where E_{k} is the (constant) complex amplitude vector, i is the imaginary unit, k is the wave vector (whose magnitude k is the angular wavenumber), r is the position vector, ω is the angular frequency, t is time, and it is understood that the real part of the expression is the physical field. (Note: The above form (1) is typically used by physicists. Electrical engineers typically prefer the form E_{k} e^{j(ωt−k⋅r)}; that is, they not only use j instead of i for the imaginary unit, but also change the sign of the exponent, with the result that the whole expression is replaced by its complex conjugate, leaving the real part unchanged [Cf. (e.g.) Collin, 1966, p. 41, eq. (2.81)]. The electrical engineers' form and the formulas derived therefrom may be converted to the physicists' convention by substituting −i for j.) The value of the expression is unchanged if the position r varies in a direction normal to k; hence k is normal to the wavefronts.

To advance the phase by the angle ϕ, we replace ωt by ωt + ϕ (that is, we replace −ωt by −ωt − ϕ), with the result that the (complex) field is multiplied by e^{−iϕ}. So a phase advance is equivalent to multiplication by a complex constant with a negative argument. This becomes more obvious when the field (1) is factored as E_{k} e^{ik⋅r}e^{−iωt}, where the last factor contains the time-dependence. That factor also implies that differentiation w.r.t. time corresponds to multiplication by −iω. (Note: In the electrical engineering convention, the time-dependent factor is e^{jωt}, so that a phase advance corresponds to multiplication by a complex constant with a positive argument, and differentiation w.r.t. time corresponds to multiplication by +jω. This article, however, uses the physics convention, whose time-dependent factor is e^{−iωt}. Although the imaginary unit does not appear explicitly in the results given here, the time-dependent factor affects the interpretation of any results that turn out to be complex.)

If ℓ is the component of r in the direction of k, the field (1) can be written E_{k} e^{i(kℓ−ωt)}. If the argument of e^{i(⋯)} is to be constant, ℓ must increase at the velocity $\omega/k\,,\,$ known as the phase velocity (v_{p}). This in turn is equal to $c/n$. Solving for k gives

$k=n\omega/c\,.$	2

As usual, we drop the time-dependent factor e^{−iωt}, which is understood to multiply every complex field quantity. The electric field for a uniform plane sine wave will then be represented by the location-dependent phasor

$\mathbf{E_k}e^{i\mathbf{k\cdot r}}.$	3

For fields of that form, Faraday's law and the Maxwell-Ampère law respectively reduce to
$$\begin{align}
\omega\mathbf{B} &=  \mathbf{k}\times\mathbf{E}\\
\omega\mathbf{D} &= -\mathbf{k}\times\mathbf{H}\,.
\end{align}$$

Putting B = μH and D = ϵE, as above, we can eliminate B and D to obtain equations in only E and H:
$$\begin{align}
\omega\mu\mathbf{H} &=  \mathbf{k}\times\mathbf{E}\\
\omega\epsilon\mathbf{E} &= -\mathbf{k}\times\mathbf{H}\,.
\end{align}$$
If the material parameters ϵ and μ are real (as in a lossless dielectric), these equations show that k, E, H form a right-handed orthogonal triad, so that the same equations apply to the magnitudes of the respective vectors. Taking the magnitude equations and substituting from (2), we obtain
$$\begin{align}
\mu cH &= nE\\
\epsilon cE &= nH\,,
\end{align}$$
where H and E are the magnitudes of H and E. Multiplying the last two equations gives

$n = c\,\sqrt{\mu\epsilon}\,.$	4

Dividing (or cross-multiplying) the same two equations gives H = YE, where

$Y = \sqrt{\epsilon/\mu}\,.$	5

This is the intrinsic admittance.

From (4) we obtain the phase velocity $c/n=1\big/\!\sqrt{\mu\epsilon\,}$. For vacuum this reduces to $c=1\big/\!\sqrt{\mu_0\epsilon_0}$. Dividing the second result by the first gives
$$n=\sqrt{\mu_{\text{rel}}\epsilon_{\text{rel}}}\,.$$
For a non-magnetic medium (the usual case), this becomes $n=\sqrt{\epsilon_{\text{rel} } }$. (Taking the reciprocal of (5), we find that the intrinsic impedance is $Z=\sqrt{\mu/\epsilon}$. In vacuum this takes the value $Z_0=\sqrt{\mu_0/\epsilon_0}\,\approx 377\,\Omega\,,$ known as the impedance of free space. By division, $Z/Z_0=\sqrt{\mu_{\text{rel}}/\epsilon_{\text{rel}}}$. For a non-magnetic medium, this becomes $Z=Z_0\big/\!\sqrt{\epsilon_{\text{rel}}}=Z_0/n.$)

=== Wave vectors ===
Incident, reflected, and transmitted wave vectors (k_{i}, k_{r}, and k_{t}), for incidence from a medium with refractive index n_{1} to a medium with refractive index n_{2}. The red arrows are perpendicular to the wave vectors.

In Cartesian coordinates (x, y, z), let the region y < 0 have refractive index n_{1}, intrinsic admittance Y_{1}, etc., and let the region y > 0 have refractive index n_{2}, intrinsic admittance Y_{2}, etc. Then the xz plane is the interface, and the y axis is normal to the interface (see diagram). Let i and j (in bold roman type) be the unit vectors in the x and y directions, respectively. Let the plane of incidence be the xy plane (the plane of the page), with the angle of incidence θ_{i} measured from j towards i. Let the angle of refraction, measured in the same sense, be θ_{t}, where the subscript t stands for transmitted (reserving r for reflected).

In the absence of Doppler shifts, ω does not change on reflection or refraction. Hence, by (2), the magnitude of the wave vector is proportional to the refractive index.

So, for a given ω, if we redefine k as the magnitude of the wave vector in the reference medium (for which n = 1), then the wave vector has magnitude n_{1}k in the first medium (region y < 0 in the diagram) and magnitude n_{2}k in the second medium. From the magnitudes and the geometry, we find that the wave vectors are
$$\begin{align}
\mathbf{k}_\text{i} &= n_1 k(\mathbf{i}\sin\theta_\text{i} + \mathbf{j}\cos\theta_\text{i})\\[.5ex]
\mathbf{k}_\text{r} &= n_1 k(\mathbf{i}\sin\theta_\text{i} - \mathbf{j}\cos\theta_\text{i})\\[.5ex]
\mathbf{k}_\text{t} &= n_2 k(\mathbf{i}\sin\theta_\text{t} + \mathbf{j}\cos\theta_\text{t})\\
&= k(\mathbf{i}\,n_1\sin\theta_\text{i} + \mathbf{j}\,n_2\cos\theta_\text{t})\,,
\end{align}$$
where the last step uses Snell's law. The corresponding dot products in the phasor form (3) are

$$\begin{align} \mathbf{k}_\text{i}\mathbf{\cdot r} &= n_1 k(x\sin\theta_\text{i} + y\cos\theta_\text{i})\\ \mathbf{k}_\text{r}\mathbf{\cdot r} &= n_1 k(x\sin\theta_\text{i} - y\cos\theta_\text{i})\\ \mathbf{k}_\text{t}\mathbf{\cdot r} &= k(n_1 x\sin\theta_\text{i} + n_2 y\cos\theta_\text{t})\,. \end{align}$$	6

Hence:

At $y=0,\ \mathbf{k}_\text{i}\mathbf{\cdot r}=\mathbf{k}_\text{r}\mathbf{\cdot r}=\mathbf{k}_\text{t}\mathbf{\cdot r}=n_1 kx\sin\theta_\text{i}\,.$	7

=== s components ===
For the s polarization, the E field is parallel to the z axis and may therefore be described by its component in the z direction. Let the reflection and transmission coefficients be r_{s} and t_{s}, respectively. Then, if the incident E field is taken to have unit amplitude, the phasor form (3) of its z-component is

$E_\text{i}=e^{i\mathbf{k}_\text{i}\mathbf{\cdot r}},$	8

and the reflected and transmitted fields, in the same form, are

$$\begin{align} E_\text{r} &= r_{s\,} e^{i\mathbf{k}_\text{r}\mathbf{\cdot r}}\\ E_\text{t} &= t_{s\,} e^{i\mathbf{k}_\text{t}\mathbf{\cdot r}}. \end{align}$$	9

Under the sign convention used in this article, a positive reflection or transmission coefficient is one that preserves the direction of the transverse field, meaning (in this context) the field normal to the plane of incidence. For the s polarization, that means the E field. If the incident, reflected, and transmitted E fields (in the above equations) are in the z-direction ("out of the page"), then the respective H fields are in the directions of the red arrows, since k, E, H form a right-handed orthogonal triad. The H fields may therefore be described by their components in the directions of those arrows, denoted by H_{i}, H_{r}, H_{t}. Then, since H = YE,

$$\begin{align} H_\text{i} &=\, Y_1 e^{i\mathbf{k}_\text{i}\mathbf{\cdot r}}\\ H_\text{r} &=\, Y_1 r_{s\,} e^{i\mathbf{k}_\text{r}\mathbf{\cdot r}}\\ H_\text{t} &=\, Y_2 t_{s\,} e^{i\mathbf{k}_\text{t}\mathbf{\cdot r}}. \end{align}$$	10

At the interface, by the usual interface conditions for electromagnetic fields, the tangential components of the E and H fields must be continuous; that is,

$$\left.\begin{align} E_\text{i} + E_\text{r} &= E_\text{t}\\ H_\text{i}\cos\theta_\text{i} - H_\text{r}\cos\theta_\text{i} &= H_\text{t}\cos\theta_\text{t} \end{align}~~\right\}~~~\text{at}~~ y=0\,.$$	11

When we substitute from equations (8) to (10) and then from (7), the exponential factors cancel out, so that the interface conditions reduce to the simultaneous equations

$$\begin{align} 1 + r_\text{s} &=\, t_\text{s}\\ Y_1\cos\theta_\text{i} - Y_1 r_\text{s}\cos\theta_\text{i} &=\, Y_2 t_\text{s}\cos\theta_\text{t} \,, \end{align}$$	12

which are easily solved for r_{s} and t_{s}, yielding

$r_\text{s}=\frac{Y_1\cos\theta_\text{i}-Y_2\cos\theta_\text{t}}{Y_1\cos\theta_\text{i}+Y_2\cos\theta_\text{t}}$	13

and

$t_\text{s}=\frac{2Y_1\cos\theta_\text{i}}{Y_1\cos\theta_\text{i}+Y_2\cos\theta_\text{t}}\,.$	14

At normal incidence (θ_{i} = θ_{t} = 0), indicated by an additional subscript 0, these results become

$r_\text{s0}=\frac{Y_1-Y_2}{Y_1+Y_2}$	15

and

$t_\text{s0}=\frac{2Y_1}{Y_1+Y_2}\,.$	16

At grazing incidence (θ_{i} → 90°), we have cos θ_{i} → 0, hence r_{s} → −1 and t_{s} → 0.

=== p components ===
For the p polarization, the incident, reflected, and transmitted E fields are parallel to the red arrows and may therefore be described by their components in the directions of those arrows. Let those components be E_{i}, E_{r}, E_{t} (redefining the symbols for the new context). Let the reflection and transmission coefficients be r_{p} and t_{p}. Then, if the incident E field is taken to have unit amplitude, we have

$$\begin{align} E_\text{i} &=         e^{i\mathbf{k}_\text{i}\mathbf{\cdot r}}\\ E_\text{r} &= r_{p\,} e^{i\mathbf{k}_\text{r}\mathbf{\cdot r}}\\ E_\text{t} &= t_{p\,} e^{i\mathbf{k}_\text{t}\mathbf{\cdot r}}. \end{align}$$	17

If the E fields are in the directions of the red arrows, then, in order for k, E, H to form a right-handed orthogonal triad, the respective H fields must be in the −z-direction ("into the page") and may therefore be described by their components in that direction. This is consistent with the adopted sign convention, namely that a positive reflection or transmission coefficient is one that preserves the direction of the transverse field (the H field in the case of the p polarization). The agreement of the other field with the red arrows reveals an alternative definition of the sign convention: that a positive reflection or transmission coefficient is one for which the field vector in the plane of incidence points towards the same medium before and after reflection or transmission.

So, for the incident, reflected, and transmitted H fields, let the respective components in the −z-direction be H_{i}, H_{r}, H_{t}. Then, since H = YE,

$$\begin{align} H_\text{i} &=\, Y_1 e^{i\mathbf{k}_\text{i}\mathbf{\cdot r}}\\ H_\text{r} &=\, Y_1 r_{p\,} e^{i\mathbf{k}_\text{r}\mathbf{\cdot r}}\\ H_\text{t} &=\, Y_2 t_{p\,} e^{i\mathbf{k}_\text{t}\mathbf{\cdot r}}. \end{align}$$	18

At the interface, the tangential components of the E and H fields must be continuous; that is,

$$\left.\begin{align} E_\text{i}\cos\theta_\text{i} - E_\text{r}\cos\theta_\text{i} &= E_\text{t}\cos\theta_\text{t}\\ H_\text{i} + H_\text{r} &= H_\text{t} \end{align}~~\right\}~~~\text{at}~~ y=0\,.$$	19

When we substitute from equations (17) and (18) and then from (7), the exponential factors again cancel out, so that the interface conditions reduce to

$$\begin{align} \cos\theta_\text{i} - r_\text{p}\cos\theta_\text{i} &=\, t_\text{p}\cos\theta_\text{t}\\ Y_1 + Y_1 r_\text{p} &=\, Y_2 t_\text{p} \,. \end{align}$$	20

Solving for r_{p} and t_{p}, we find

$r_\text{p}=\frac{Y_2\cos\theta_\text{i}-Y_1\cos\theta_\text{t}}{Y_2\cos\theta_\text{i}+Y_1\cos\theta_\text{t}}$	21

and

$t_\text{p}=\frac{2Y_1\cos\theta_\text{i}}{Y_2\cos\theta_\text{i}+Y_1\cos\theta_\text{t}}\,.$	22

At normal incidence (θ_{i} = θ_{t} = 0) indicated by an additional subscript 0, these results become

$r_\text{p0}=\frac{Y_2-Y_1}{Y_2+Y_1}$	23

and

$t_\text{p0}=\frac{2Y_1}{Y_2+Y_1}\,.$	24

At grazing incidence (θ_{i} → 90°), we again have cos θ_{i} → 0, hence r_{p} → −1 and t_{p} → 0.

Comparing (23) and (24) with (15) and (16), we see that at normal incidence, under the adopted sign convention, the transmission coefficients for the two polarizations are equal, whereas the reflection coefficients have equal magnitudes but opposite signs. While this clash of signs is a disadvantage of the convention, the attendant advantage is that the signs agree at grazing incidence.

=== Power ratios (reflectivity and transmissivity) ===
The Poynting vector for a wave is a vector whose component in any direction is the irradiance (power per unit area) of that wave on a surface perpendicular to that direction. For a plane sinusoidal wave the Poynting vector is 1/2Re{E × H^{∗}}, where E and H are due only to the wave in question, and the asterisk denotes complex conjugation. Inside a lossless dielectric (the usual case), E and H are in phase, and at right angles to each other and to the wave vector k; so, for s polarization, using the z and xy components of E and H respectively (or for p polarization, using the xy and −z components of E and H), the irradiance in the direction of k is given simply by EH/2, which is E^{2}/2Z in a medium of intrinsic impedance Z = 1/Y. To compute the irradiance in the direction normal to the interface, as we shall require in the definition of the power transmission coefficient, we could use only the x component (rather than the full xy component) of H or E or, equivalently, simply multiply EH/2 by the proper geometric factor, obtaining (E^{2}/2Z)cos θ.

From equations (13) and (21), taking squared magnitudes, we find that the reflectivity (ratio of reflected power to incident power) is

$R_\text{s}=\left|\frac{Y_1\cos\theta_\text{i}-Y_2\cos\theta_\text{t}}{Y_1\cos\theta_\text{i}+Y_2\cos\theta_\text{t}}\right|^2$	25

for the s polarization, and

$R_\text{p}=\left|\frac{Y_2\cos\theta_\text{i}-Y_1\cos\theta_\text{t}}{Y_2\cos\theta_\text{i}+Y_1\cos\theta_\text{t}}\right|^2$	26

for the p polarization. Note that when comparing the powers of two such waves in the same medium and with the same cos θ, the impedance and geometric factors mentioned above are identical and cancel out. But in computing the power transmission (below), these factors must be taken into account.

The simplest way to obtain the power transmission coefficient (transmissivity, the ratio of transmitted power to incident power in the direction normal to the interface, i.e. the y direction) is to use R + T = 1 (conservation of energy). In this way we find

$T_\text{s} =1-R_\text{s} =\,\frac{4\,\text{Re}\{ Y_1 Y_2\cos\theta_\text{i}\cos\theta_\text{t}\}}{\left|Y_1\cos\theta_\text{i}+Y_2\cos\theta_\text{t}\right|^2}$	25T

for the s polarization, and

$T_\text{p} =1-R_\text{p} =\,\frac{4\,\text{Re}\{Y_1 Y_2\cos\theta_\text{i}\cos\theta_\text{t}\}}{\left|Y_2\cos\theta_\text{i}+Y_1\cos\theta_\text{t}\right|^2}$	26T

for the p polarization.

In the case of an interface between two lossless media (for which ϵ and μ are real and positive), one can obtain these results directly using the squared magnitudes of the amplitude transmission coefficients that we found earlier in equations (14) and (22). But, for given amplitude (as noted above), the component of the Poynting vector in the y direction is proportional to the geometric factor cos θ and inversely proportional to the wave impedance Z. Applying these corrections to each wave, we obtain two ratios multiplying the square of the amplitude transmission coefficient:

$T_\text{s} =\left(\frac{2Y_1\cos\theta_\text{i}}{Y_1\cos\theta_\text{i}+Y_2\cos\theta_\text{t}}\right)^2\frac{\,Y_2\,}{Y_1}\,\frac{\cos\theta_\text{t}}{\cos\theta_\text{i}} =\frac{4Y_1 Y_2\cos\theta_\text{i}\cos\theta_\text{t}}{\left(Y_1\cos\theta_\text{i}+Y_2\cos\theta_\text{t}\right)^2}$	27

for the s polarization, and

$T_\text{p} =\left(\frac{2Y_1\cos\theta_\text{i}}{Y_2\cos\theta_\text{i}+Y_1\cos\theta_\text{t}}\right)^2\frac{\,Y_2\,}{Y_1}\,\frac{\cos\theta_\text{t}}{\cos\theta_\text{i}} =\frac{4Y_1 Y_2\cos\theta_\text{i}\cos\theta_\text{t}}{\left(Y_2\cos\theta_\text{i}+Y_1\cos\theta_\text{t}\right)^2}$	28

for the p polarization. The last two equations apply only to lossless dielectrics, and only at incidence angles smaller than the critical angle (beyond which, of course, T = 0).

For unpolarized light:
$$T={1 \over 2}(T_s+T_p)$$
$$R={1 \over 2}(R_s+R_p)$$
where $R+T=1$.

=== Equal refractive indices ===
From equations (4) and (5), we see that two dissimilar media will have the same refractive index, but different admittances, if the ratio of their permeabilities is the inverse of the ratio of their permittivities. In that unusual situation we have θ_{t} = θ_{i} (that is, the transmitted ray is undeviated), so that the cosines in equations (13), (14), (21), (22), and (25) to (28) cancel out, and all the reflection and transmission ratios become independent of the angle of incidence; in other words, the ratios for normal incidence become applicable to all angles of incidence. When extended to spherical reflection or scattering, this results in the Kerker effect for Mie scattering.

=== Non-magnetic media ===
Since the Fresnel equations were developed for optics, they are usually given for non-magnetic materials. Dividing (4) by (5)) yields
$$Y=\frac{n}{\,c\mu\,}\,.$$
For non-magnetic media we can substitute the vacuum permeability μ_{0} for μ, so that
$$Y_1=\frac{n_1}{\,c\mu_0} ~~;~~~ Y_2=\frac{n_2}{\,c\mu_0}\,;$$
that is, the admittances are simply proportional to the corresponding refractive indices. When we make these substitutions in equations (13) to (16) and equations (21) to (26), the factor cμ_{0} cancels out. For the amplitude coefficients we obtain:

$r_\text{s}=\frac{n_1\cos\theta_\text{i}-n_2\cos\theta_\text{t}}{n_1\cos\theta_\text{i}+n_2\cos\theta_\text{t}}$	29

$t_\text{s}=\frac{2n_1\cos\theta_\text{i}}{n_1\cos\theta_\text{i}+n_2\cos\theta_\text{t}}\,$	30

$r_\text{p}=\frac{n_2\cos\theta_\text{i}-n_1\cos\theta_\text{t}}{n_2\cos\theta_\text{i}+n_1\cos\theta_\text{t}}$	31

$t_\text{p}=\frac{2n_1\cos\theta_\text{i}}{n_2\cos\theta_\text{i}+n_1\cos\theta_\text{t}}\,.$	32

For the case of normal incidence these reduce to:

$r_\text{s0}=\frac{n_1-n_2}{n_1+n_2}$	33

$t_\text{s0}=\frac{2n_1}{n_1+n_2}$	34

$r_\text{p0}=\frac{n_2-n_1}{n_2+n_1}$	35

$t_\text{p0}=\frac{2n_1}{n_2+n_1}\,.$	36

The power reflection coefficients become:

$R_\text{s}=\left|\frac{n_1\cos\theta_\text{i}-n_2\cos\theta_\text{t}}{n_1\cos\theta_\text{i}+n_2\cos\theta_\text{t}}\right|^2$	37

$R_\text{p}=\left|\frac{n_2\cos\theta_\text{i}-n_1\cos\theta_\text{t}}{n_2\cos\theta_\text{i}+n_1\cos\theta_\text{t}}\right|^2\,.$	38

The power transmissions can then be found from T = 1 − R.

=== Brewster's angle ===
For equal permeabilities (e.g., non-magnetic media), if θ_{i} and θ_{t} are complementary, we can substitute sin θ_{t} for cos θ_{i}, and sin θ_{i} for cos θ_{t}, so that the numerator in equation (31) becomes n_{2}sin θ_{t} − n_{1}sin θ_{i}, which is zero (by Snell's law). Hence r_{p} = 0 and only the s-polarized component is reflected. This is what happens at the Brewster angle. Substituting cos θ_{i} for sin θ_{t} in Snell's law, we readily obtain

$\theta_\text{i}=\arctan(n_2/n_1)$	39

for Brewster's angle.

=== Equal permittivities ===
Although it is not encountered in practice, the equations can also apply to the case of two media with a common permittivity but different refractive indices due to different permeabilities. From equations (4) and (5), if ϵ is fixed instead of μ, then Y becomes inversely proportional to n, with the result that the subscripts 1 and 2 in equations (29) to (38) are interchanged (due to the additional step of multiplying the numerator and denominator by n_{1}n_{2}). Hence, in (29) and (31), the expressions for r_{s} and r_{p} in terms of refractive indices will be interchanged, so that Brewster's angle (39) will give r_{s} = 0 instead of r_{p} = 0, and any beam reflected at that angle will be p-polarized instead of s-polarized. Similarly, Fresnel's sine law will apply to the p polarization instead of the s polarization, and his tangent law to the s polarization instead of the p polarization.

This switch of polarizations has an analog in the old mechanical theory of light waves (see § History above). One could predict reflection coefficients that agreed with observation by supposing (like Fresnel) that different refractive indices were due to different densities and that the vibrations were normal to what was then called the plane of polarization, or by supposing (like MacCullagh and Neumann) that different refractive indices were due to different elasticities and that the vibrations were parallel to that plane. Thus the condition of equal permittivities and unequal permeabilities, although not realistic, is of some historical interest.

== See also ==
- Jones calculus
- Polarization mixing
- Index-matching material
- Power, root-power, and field quantities
- Fresnel rhomb, Fresnel's apparatus to produce circularly polarised light
- Reflection coefficient
- Specular reflection
- Schlick's approximation
- Snell's window
- X-ray reflectivity
- Plane of incidence
- Reflections of signals on conducting lines

== Sources ==
- M. Born and E. Wolf, 1970, Principles of Optics, 4th ed., Oxford: Pergamon Press.
- J. Z. Buchwald, 1989, The Rise of the Wave Theory of Light: Optical Theory and Experiment in the Early Nineteenth Century, University of Chicago Press, ISBN 0-226-07886-8.
- R. E. Collin, 1966, Foundations for Microwave Engineering, Tokyo: McGraw-Hill.
- O. Darrigol, 2012, A History of Optics: From Greek Antiquity to the Nineteenth Century, Oxford, ISBN 978-0-19-964437-7.
- A. Fresnel, 1866 (ed. H. de Senarmont, E. Verdet, and L. Fresnel), Oeuvres complètes d'Augustin Fresnel, Paris: Imprimerie Impériale (3 vols., 1866–70), vol. 1 (1866).
- Griffiths, David J. (2017). "Chapter 9.3: Electromagnetic Waves in Matter". Introduction to Electrodynamics (4th ed.). Cambridge University Press. ISBN 978-1-108-42041-9.
- E. Hecht, 1987, Optics, 2nd ed., Addison Wesley, ISBN 0-201-11609-X.
- E. Hecht, 2002, Optics, 4th ed., Addison Wesley, ISBN 0-321-18878-0.
- F. A. Jenkins and H. E. White, 1976, Fundamentals of Optics, 4th ed., New York: McGraw-Hill, ISBN 0-07-032330-5.
- H. Lloyd, 1834, "Report on the progress and present state of physical optics", Report of the Fourth Meeting of the British Association for the Advancement of Science (held at Edinburgh in 1834), London: J. Murray, 1835, pp. 295–413.
- W. Whewell, 1857, History of the Inductive Sciences: From the Earliest to the Present Time, 3rd ed., London: J. W. Parker & Son, vol. 2.
- E. T. Whittaker, 1910, A History of the Theories of Aether and Electricity: From the Age of Descartes to the Close of the Nineteenth Century, London: Longmans, Green, & Co.
