= Sinusoidal plane-wave solutions of the electromagnetic wave equation =

Particular solutions to the electromagnetic wave equation

Sinusoidal plane-wave solutions are particular solutions to the wave equation.

The general solution of the electromagnetic wave equation in homogeneous, linear, time-independent media can be written as a linear superposition of plane-waves of different frequencies and polarizations.

The treatment in this article is classical but, because of the generality of Maxwell's equations for electrodynamics, the treatment can be converted into the quantum mechanical treatment with only a reinterpretation of classical quantities (aside from the quantum mechanical treatment needed for charge and current densities).

The reinterpretation is based on the theories of Max Planck and the interpretations by Albert Einstein of those theories and of other experiments. The quantum generalization of the classical treatment can be found in the articles on photon polarization and photon dynamics in the double-slit experiment.

== Explanation ==
Experimentally, every light signal can be decomposed into a spectrum of frequencies and wavelengths associated with sinusoidal solutions of the wave equation. Polarizing filters can be used to decompose light into its various polarization components. The polarization components can be linear, circular or elliptical.

== Plane waves ==
The plane sinusoidal solution for an electromagnetic wave traveling in the z direction is
$$\begin{align}
\mathbf{E} ( \mathbf{r} , t )
&= \begin{pmatrix}
E_{0,x} \cos \left ( kz-\omega t + \alpha_x \right ) \\
E_{0,y} \cos \left ( kz-\omega t + \alpha_y \right ) \\
0
\end{pmatrix} \\[1ex]
&= E_{0,x} \cos \left ( kz-\omega t + \alpha_x \right ) \, \hat {\mathbf{x}} \; + \; E_{0,y} \cos \left ( kz-\omega t + \alpha_y \right ) \, \hat {\mathbf{y}}
\end{align}$$
for the electric field and
$$\begin{align}
c \, \mathbf{B} ( \mathbf{r} , t )
&= \hat { \mathbf{z} } \times \mathbf{E} ( \mathbf{r} , t )
\\[1ex]
&= \begin{pmatrix}
-E_{0,y} \cos \left ( kz-\omega t + \alpha_y \right ) \\
\hphantom{-}E_{0,x} \cos \left ( kz-\omega t + \alpha_x \right ) \\
0
\end{pmatrix}
\\[1ex]
&= -E_{0,y} \cos \left ( kz-\omega t + \alpha_y \right ) \hat {\mathbf{x}} \; + \; E_{0,x} \cos \left ( kz-\omega t + \alpha_x \right ) \hat {\mathbf{y}}
\end{align}$$
for the magnetic field, where k is the wavenumber, $\omega = c k$ $\omega$ is the angular frequency of the wave, and $c$ is the speed of light. The hats on the vectors indicate unit vectors in the x, y, and z directions. r = (x, y, z) is the position vector (in meters).

The plane wave is parameterized by the amplitudes

Electromagnetic radiation can be imagined as a self-propagating transverse oscillating wave of electric and magnetic fields. This diagram shows a plane linearly polarized wave propagating from right to left. The magnetic field (labeled M) is in a horizontal plane, and the electric field (labeled E) is in a vertical plane.

$$\begin{align}
E_{0,x} &= \left| \mathbf{E} \right| \cos \theta \\[1.56ex]
E_{0,y} &= \left| \mathbf{E} \right| \sin \theta
\end{align}$$
and phases $\alpha_x , \alpha_y$ where $\theta \ \stackrel{\mathrm{def}}{=}\ \tan^{-1} \left ( \frac{E_{0,y}}{E_{0, x}} \right ) .$ and $\left| \mathbf{E} \right|^2 \ \stackrel{\mathrm{def}}{=}\ \left ( E_{0,x} \right )^2 + \left ( E_{0,y} \right )^2 .$

== Polarization state vector ==
=== Jones vector ===
All the polarization information can be reduced to a single vector, called the Jones vector, in the x-y plane. This vector, while arising from a purely classical treatment of polarization, can be interpreted as a quantum state vector. The connection with quantum mechanics is made in the article on photon polarization.

The vector emerges from the plane-wave solution. The electric field solution can be rewritten in complex notation as $\mathbf{E} ( \mathbf{r} , t ) = |\mathbf{E}| \, \operatorname\mathcal{R_e}\left[ |\psi\rangle e^{ i ( kz - \omega t ) } \right]$ where
$$|\psi\rangle \ \stackrel{\mathrm{def}}{=}\  \begin{pmatrix} \psi_x \\ \psi_y   \end{pmatrix} = \begin{pmatrix} \cos(\theta) e^{i \alpha_x} \\ \sin(\theta) e^{i \alpha_y} \end{pmatrix}$$
is the Jones vector in the x-y plane. The notation for this vector is the bra–ket notation of Dirac, which is normally used in a quantum context. The quantum notation is used here in anticipation of the interpretation of the Jones vector as a quantum state vector.

=== Dual Jones vector ===
The Jones vector has a dual given by
$$\langle \psi | \ \stackrel{\mathrm{def}}{=}\  \begin{pmatrix} \psi_x^* & \psi_y^*   \end{pmatrix} = \begin{pmatrix} \cos(\theta) e^{-i \alpha_x} & \sin(\theta) e^{-i \alpha_y} \end{pmatrix}.$$

=== Normalization of the Jones vector ===
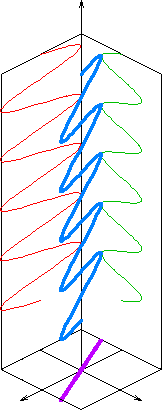
Linear polarization.

A Jones vector represents a specific wave with a specific phase, amplitude and state of polarization. When one is using a Jones vector simply to indicate a state of polarization, then it is customary for it to be normalized. That requires that the inner product of the vector with itself to be unity:
$$\langle \psi | \psi \rangle = \begin{pmatrix} \psi_x^* & \psi_y^* \end{pmatrix} \begin{pmatrix} \psi_x \\ \psi_y \end{pmatrix} = 1 .$$

An arbitrary Jones vector can simply be scaled to achieve this property. All normalized Jones vectors represent a wave of the same intensity (within a particular isotropic medium). Even given a normalized Jones vector, multiplication by a pure phase factor will result in a different normalized Jones vector representing the same state of polarization.

== Polarization states ==
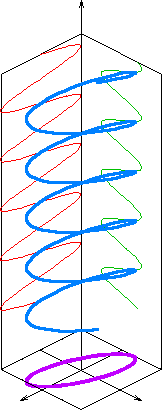
Elliptical polarization.

=== Linear polarization ===
In general, the wave is linearly polarized when the phase angles $\alpha_x , \alpha_y$ are equal, $\alpha_x = \alpha_y \ \stackrel{\mathrm{def}}{=}\ \alpha .$

This represents a wave polarized at an angle $\theta$ with respect to the x axis. In that case the Jones vector can be written
$$|\psi\rangle  =   \begin{pmatrix} \cos\theta \\ \sin\theta   \end{pmatrix} e^{i \alpha} .$$

=== Elliptical and circular polarization ===
The general case in which the electric field is not confined to one direction but rotates in the x-y plane is called elliptical polarization. The state vector is given by
$$|\psi\rangle = \begin{pmatrix} \psi_x  \\ \psi_y \end{pmatrix} = \begin{pmatrix} \cos(\theta) e^{i \alpha_x} \\ \sin(\theta) e^{i \alpha_y} \end{pmatrix} = e^{i \alpha} \begin{pmatrix} \cos(\theta) \\ \sin(\theta) e^{i \Delta \alpha} \end{pmatrix} .$$

In the special case of $\Delta\alpha = 0$, this reduces to linear polarization.

Circular polarization corresponds to the special cases of $\theta=\pm\pi/4$ with $\Delta\alpha=\pi/2$. The two circular polarization states are thus given by the Jones vectors:
$$|\psi\rangle  =  \begin{pmatrix} \psi_x \\ \psi_y \end{pmatrix} =
e^{i \alpha} \frac 1 \sqrt{2}
\begin{pmatrix} 1 \\ \pm i \end{pmatrix}.$$

== See also ==
- Fourier series
- Transverse mode
- Transverse wave
- Maxwell's equations
- Electromagnetic wave equation
- Mathematical descriptions of the electromagnetic field
- Polarization from an atomic transition: linear and circular
