= Fresnel (unit) =

A fresnel is a unit of frequency equal to one trillion cycles per second (i.e., 10^{12} s^{−1}). It was occasionally used in the field of spectroscopy, but its use has been superseded by terahertz (with the identical value 10^{12} hertz). It is named for Augustin-Jean Fresnel the physicist whose expertise in optics led to the creation of Fresnel lenses.
