= Augustin-Jean Fresnel =

French optical physicist (1788–1827)

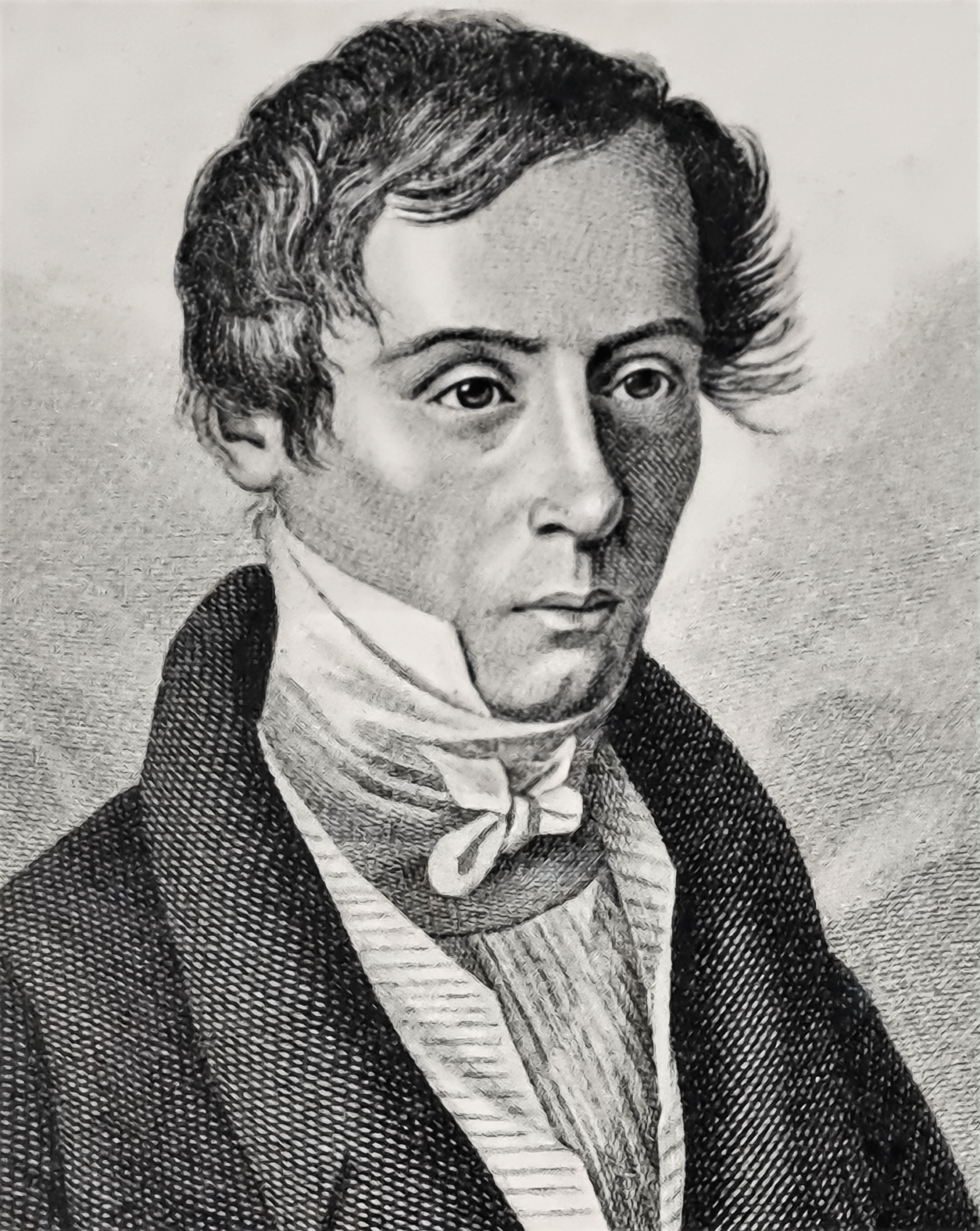
- Portrait of "Augustin Fresnel" from the frontispiece of his collected works, 1866
- Born: 10 May 1788; Broglie, Normandy, France
- Died: 14 July 1827 (aged 39); Ville-d'Avray, Île-de-France, France
- Resting place: Père Lachaise Cemetery
- Education: École polytechnique (1804–1806); École des Ponts
- Known for: Birefringence; Diffraction; Fresnel–Arago laws; Fresnel equations; Fresnel integrals; Fresnel lens; Fresnel number; Fresnel rhomb; Fresnel zone; Huygens–Fresnel principle; Phasor representation; Polarization; Wave optics
- Relatives: Fulgence Fresnel (brother); Léonor Mérimée (uncle); Prosper Mérimée (cousin)
- Awards: 1819: Academy Grand Prix; 1824: Légion d'Honneur; 1825: ForMemRS; 1827 for '24: Rumford Medal
- Scientific career
- Fields: Physics, engineering
- Workplaces: Corps des Ponts; Athénée (1819–1820); École Polytech (1821–1824)

Augustin-Jean Fresnel (Note: English pronunciation varies: /ˈfreɪnɛl, -nəl/ FRAY-nel, -nəl, or /ˈfrɛnɛl, -əl/ FREN-el, -əl, or /freɪˈnɛl/ fray-NEL. French: [oɡystɛ̃ ʒɑ̃ fʁɛnɛl].) (10 May 1788 – 14 July 1827) was a French civil engineer and physicist whose research in optics led to the almost unanimous acceptance of the wave theory of light, fully supplanting Newton's corpuscular theory, from the late 1830s until the end of the 19th century. He is perhaps better known for inventing the catadioptric (reflective/refractive) Fresnel lens and for pioneering the use of "stepped" lenses to extend the visibility of lighthouses, saving countless lives at sea. The simpler dioptric (purely refractive) stepped lens, first proposed by Count Buffon and independently reinvented by Fresnel, is used in screen magnifiers and in condenser lenses for overhead projectors.

Fresnel gave the first satisfactory explanation of diffraction by straight edges, including the first satisfactory wave-based explanation of rectilinear propagation. By further supposing that light waves are purely transverse, Fresnel explained the nature of polarization. He then worked on double refraction.

Fresnel had a lifelong battle with tuberculosis, to which he succumbed at the age of 39. He lived just long enough to receive recognition from his peers, including (on his deathbed) the Rumford Medal of the Royal Society, and his name is ubiquitous in the modern terminology of optics and waves. After the wave theory of light was subsumed by Maxwell's electromagnetic theory in the 1860s, some attention was diverted from the magnitude of Fresnel's contribution. In the period between Fresnel's unification of physical optics and Maxwell's wider unification, a contemporary authority, Humphrey Lloyd, described Fresnel's transverse-wave theory as "the noblest fabric which has ever adorned the domain of physical science, Newton's system of the universe alone excepted".

== Early life ==
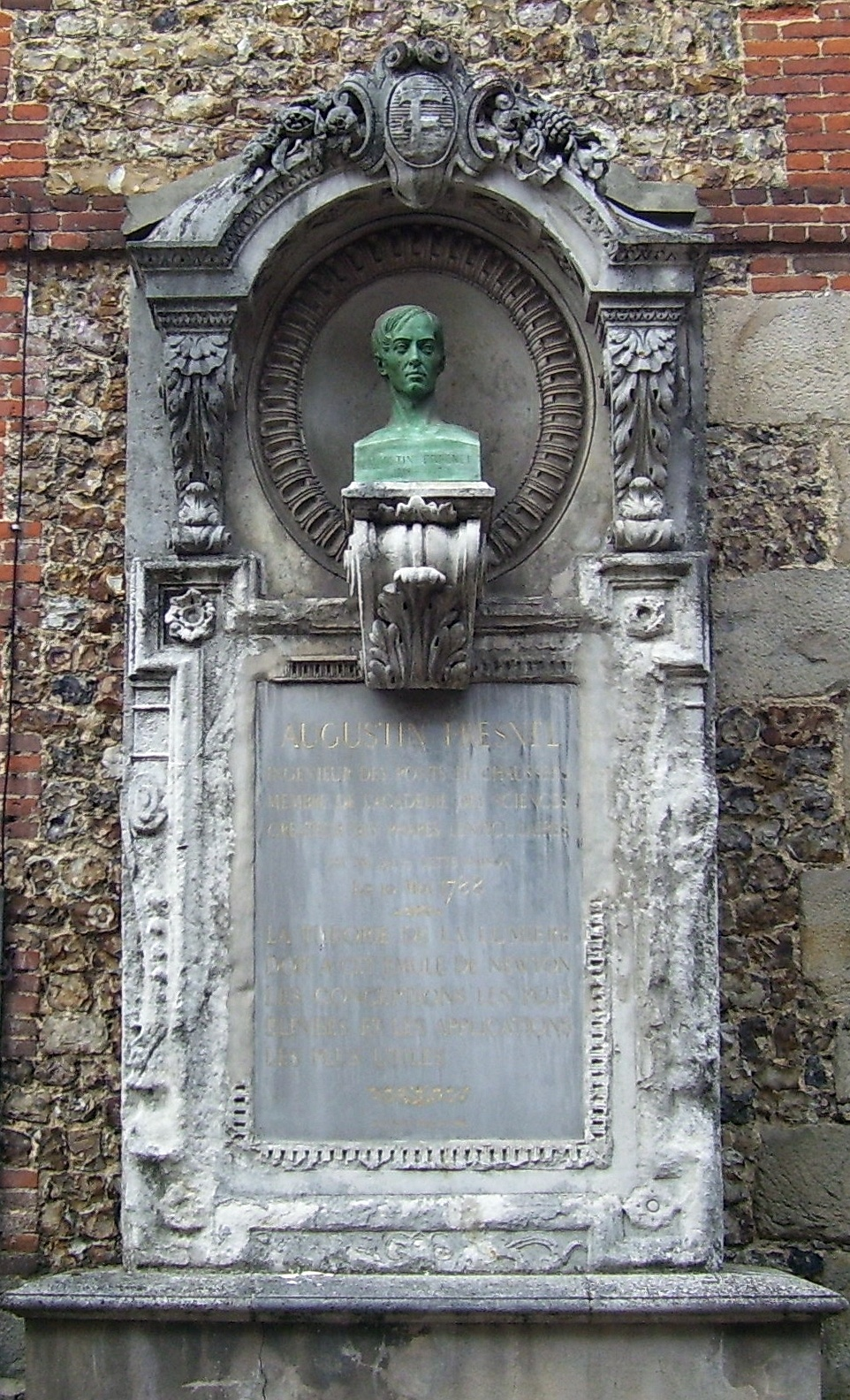
Monument to Augustin Fresnel on the facade of his birthplace at 2 Rue Augustin Fresnel, Broglie (facing Rue Jean François Mérimée), inaugurated on 14 September 1884. The inscription, when translated, says: "Augustin Fresnel, engineer of Bridges and Roads, member of the Academy of Sciences, creator of lenticular lighthouses, was born in this house on 10 May 1788. The theory of light owes to this emulator of Newton the highest concepts and the most useful applications."

=== Family ===
Augustin-Jean Fresnel (also called Augustin Jean or simply Augustin), born in Broglie, Normandy, on 10 May 1788, was the second of four sons of the architect Jacques Fresnel and his wife Augustine, née Mérimée. The family moved twice—in 1789/90 to Cherbourg, and in 1794 to Jacques's home town of Mathieu, where Augustine would spend 25 years as a widow.

The first son, Louis, was admitted to the École Polytechnique, became a lieutenant in the artillery, and was killed in action at Jaca, Spain. The third, Léonor, followed Augustin into civil engineering, succeeded him as secretary of the Lighthouse Commission, and helped to edit his collected works. The fourth, Fulgence Fresnel, became a linguist, diplomat, and orientalist, and occasionally assisted Augustin with negotiations. Fulgence died in Baghdad in 1855 having led a mission to explore Babylon.

Madame Fresnel's younger brother, Jean François "Léonor" Mérimée, father of the writer Prosper Mérimée, was a painter who turned his attention to the chemistry of painting. He became the Permanent Secretary of the École des Beaux-Arts and (until 1814) a professor at the École Polytechnique.

=== Education ===
The Fresnel brothers were initially home-schooled by their mother. The sickly Augustin was considered the slow one, not inclined to memorization; but the popular story that he hardly began to read until the age of eight is disputed. At the age of nine or ten he was undistinguished except for his ability to turn tree-branches into toy bows and guns that worked far too well, earning himself the title l'homme de génie (the man of genius) from his accomplices, and a united crackdown from their elders.

In 1801, Augustin was sent to the École Centrale at Caen, as company for Louis. But Augustin lifted his performance: in late 1804 he was accepted into the École Polytechnique, being placed 17th in the entrance examination. As the detailed records of the École Polytechnique begin in 1808, we know little of Augustin's time there, except that he made few if any friends and—in spite of continuing poor health—excelled in drawing and geometry: in his first year he took a prize for his solution to a geometry problem posed by Adrien-Marie Legendre. Graduating in 1806, he then enrolled at the École Nationale des Ponts et Chaussées (National School of Bridges and Roads, also known as "ENPC" or "École des Ponts"), from which he graduated in 1809, entering the service of the Corps des Ponts et Chaussées as an ingénieur ordinaire aspirant (ordinary engineer in training). Directly or indirectly, he was to remain in the employment of the "Corps des Ponts" for the rest of his life.

=== Religious formation ===
Fresnel's parents were Roman Catholics of the Jansenist sect, characterized by an extreme Augustinian view of original sin. Religion took first place in the boys' home-schooling. In 1802, his mother said:

I pray God to give my son the grace to employ the great talents, which he has received, for his own benefit, and for the God of all. Much will be asked from him to whom much has been given, and most will be required of him who has received most.

Augustin remained a Jansenist. He regarded his intellectual talents as gifts from God, and considered it his duty to use them for the benefit of others. According to his fellow engineer Alphonse Duleau, who helped to nurse him through his final illness, Fresnel saw the study of nature as part of the study of the power and goodness of God. He placed virtue above science and genius. In his last days he prayed for "strength of soul", not against death alone, but against "the interruption of discoveries ... of which he hoped to derive useful applications".

Jansenism is considered heretical by the Roman Catholic Church, and Grattan-Guinness suggests this is why Fresnel never gained a permanent academic teaching post; his only teaching appointment was at the Athénée in the winter of 1819–20. The article on Fresnel in the Catholic Encyclopedia does not mention his Jansenism, but describes him as "a deeply religious man and remarkable for his keen sense of duty".

== Engineering assignments ==
Fresnel was initially posted to the western département of Vendée. There, in 1811, he anticipated what became known as the Solvay process for producing soda ash, except that recycling of the ammonia was not considered. That difference may explain why leading chemists, who learned of his discovery through his uncle Léonor, eventually thought it uneconomic.

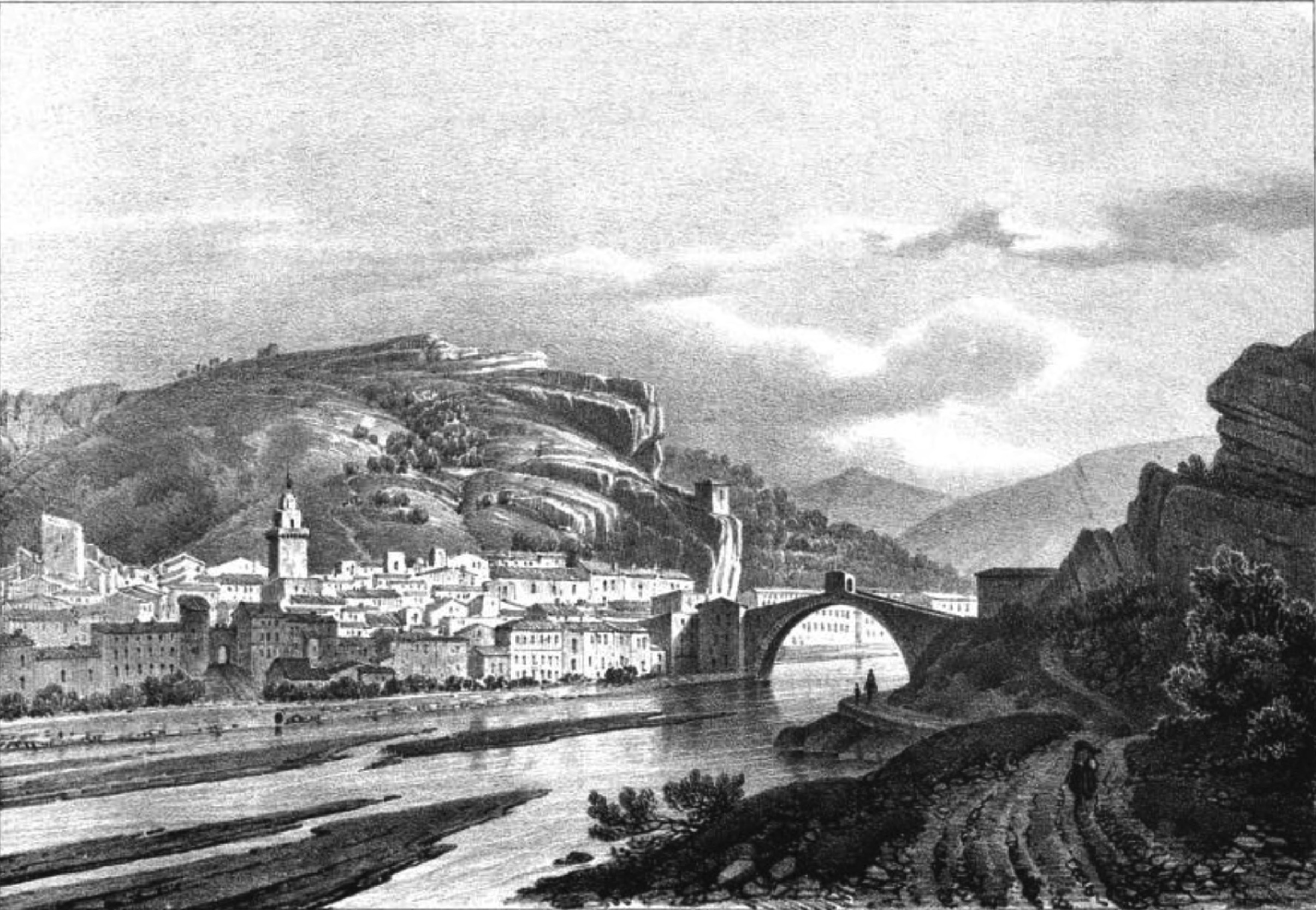
Nyons, France, 19th century, drawn by Alexandre Debelle (1805–1897)

About 1812, Fresnel was sent to Nyons, in the southern département of Drôme, to assist with the imperial highway that was to connect Spain and Italy. It is from Nyons that we have the first evidence of his interest in optics. On 15 May 1814, while work was slack due to Napoleon's defeat, Fresnel wrote a postscript to his brother Léonor, saying in part:

I would also like to have papers that might tell me about the discoveries of French physicists on the polarization of light. I saw in the Moniteur of a few months ago that Biot had read to the Institute a very interesting memoir on the polarization of light. Though I break my head, I cannot guess what that is.

As late as 28 December he was still waiting for information, but by 10 February 1815 he had received Biot's memoir. (The Institut de France had taken over the functions of the French Académie des Sciences and other académies in 1795. In 1816 the Académie des Sciences regained its name and autonomy, but remained part of the institute.)

In March 1815, perceiving Napoleon's return from Elba as "an attack on civilization", Fresnel departed without leave, hastened to Toulouse and offered his services to the royalist resistance, but soon found himself on the sick list. Returning to Nyons in defeat, he was threatened and had his windows broken. During the Hundred Days he was placed on suspension, which he was eventually allowed to spend at his mother's house in Mathieu. There he used his enforced leisure to begin his optical experiments.

== Contributions to physical optics ==
Fresnel made major contributions to several areas of physical optics. These included studies of diffraction (1815–1818), where he explained the colored fringes seen in shadows of objects illuminated by narrow beams, and conducted double-mirror experiments. He studied polarization (1816–1823), discovering that the two images produced by a birefringent crystal could not be combined to create a diffraction pattern. A third area that he studied was double refraction (1821–1826), where he found that neither of the two refractions in a topaz crystal could have been produced by ordinary spherical secondary waves.

== Lighthouses and the Fresnel lens ==
1: Cross-section of Buffon/Fresnel lens. 2: Cross-section of conventional plano-convex lens of equivalent power. (Buffon's version was biconvex.)

On 21 June 1819, Fresnel was "temporarily" seconded by the Commission des Phares (Commission of Lighthouses) to review possible improvements in lighthouse illumination.

By the end of August 1819, Fresnel recommended lentilles à échelons (lenses by steps) to replace the reflectors then in use, which reflected only about half of the incident light. Where Buffon's version was biconvex and in one piece, Fresnel's was plano-convex and made of multiple prisms for easier construction. In a public spectacle on the evening of 13 April 1821, his design was demonstrated by comparison with the most recent reflectors, which it suddenly rendered obsolete.

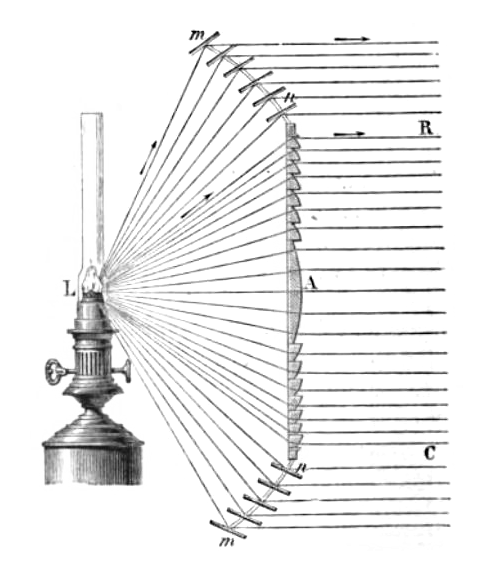
Cross-section of a first-generation Fresnel lighthouse lens, with sloping mirrors m, n above and below the refractive panel RC (with central segment A). If the cross-section in every vertical plane through the lamp L is the same, the light is spread evenly around the horizon.

Fresnel's next lens was a rotating apparatus with eight "bull's-eye" panels, made in annular arcs by Saint-Gobain, giving eight rotating beams—to be seen by mariners as a periodic flash. Above and behind each main panel was a smaller, sloping bull's-eye panel of trapezoidal outline with trapezoidal elements. The official test, conducted on the unfinished Arc de Triomphe on 20 August 1822, was witnessed by the commission—and by Louis XVIII and his entourage—from 32 km away. The apparatus was reassembled at Cordouan Lighthouse under Fresnel's supervision. On 25 July 1823, the world's first lighthouse Fresnel lens was lit.

In May 1824, Fresnel was promoted to secretary of the Commission des Phares, becoming the first member of that body to draw a salary, albeit in the concurrent role of Engineer-in-Chief.

In the same year he designed the first fixed lens—for spreading light evenly around the horizon while minimizing waste above or below, in a beehive-shaped design. The second Fresnel lens to enter service was a fixed lens, of third order, installed at Dunkirk by 1 February 1825. It had a 16-sided polygonal plan.

In 1825, Fresnel extended his fixed-lens design by adding a rotating array outside the fixed array. Each panel of the rotating array was to refract part of the fixed light from a horizontal fan into a narrow beam.

Also in 1825, Fresnel unveiled the Carte des Phares (Lighthouse Map), calling for a system of 51 lighthouses plus smaller harbor lights, in a hierarchy of lens sizes (called orders, the first order being the largest), with different characteristics to facilitate recognition: a constant light (from a fixed lens), one flash per minute (from a rotating lens with eight panels), and two per minute (sixteen panels).

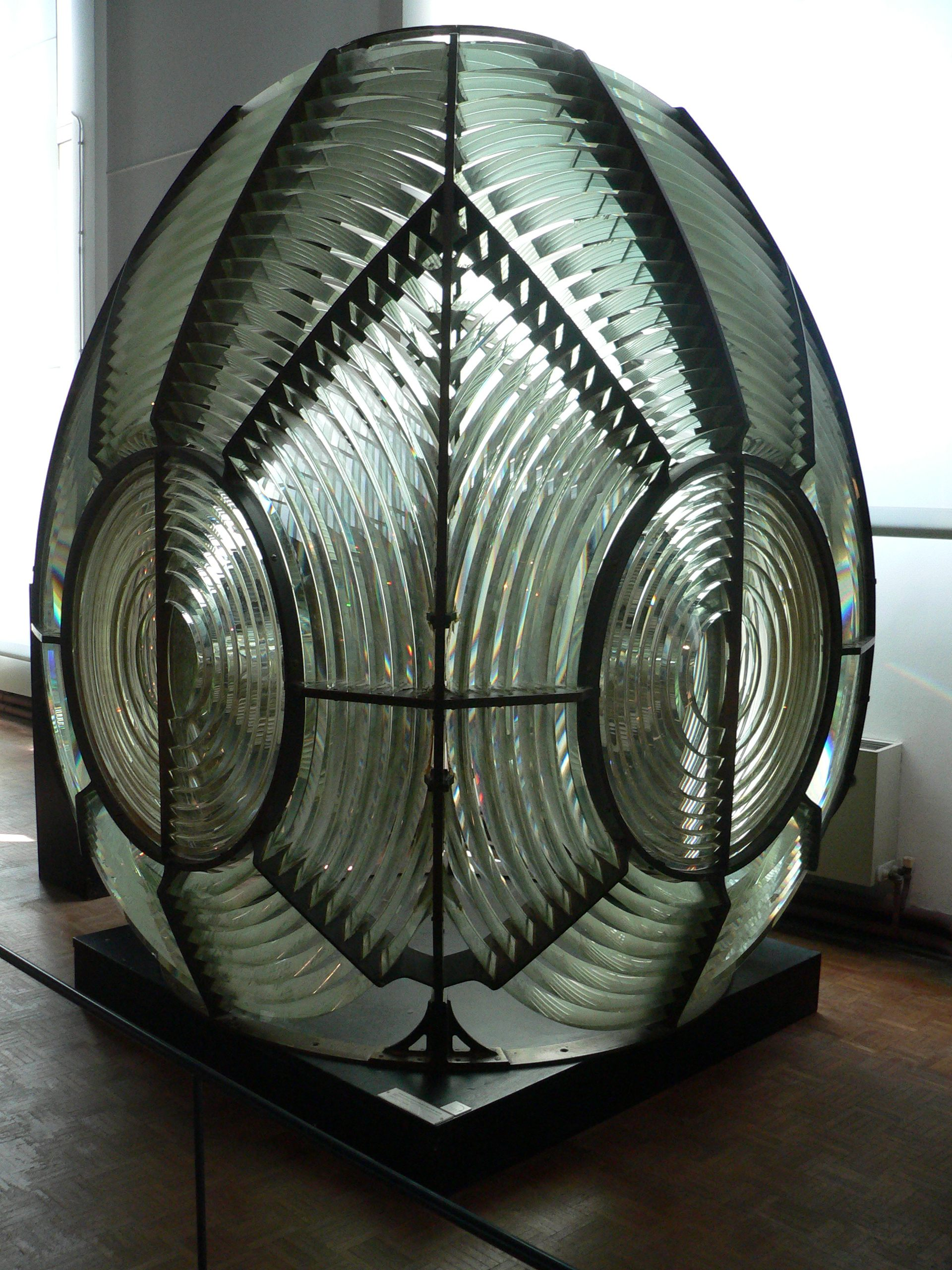
First-order rotating catadioptric Fresnel lens, dated 1870, displayed at the Musée national de la Marine, Paris. In this case the dioptric prisms (inside the bronze rings) and catadioptric prisms (outside) are arranged to give a purely flashing light with four flashes per rotation. The assembly stands 2.54 metres tall and weighs about 1.5 tonnes.

In late 1825, to reduce the loss of light in the reflecting elements, Fresnel proposed to replace each mirror with a catadioptric prism, through which the light would travel by refraction through the first surface, then total internal reflection off the second surface, then refraction through the third surface. The result was the lighthouse lens as we now know it. In 1826 he assembled a small model for use on the Canal Saint-Martin.

== Honors ==
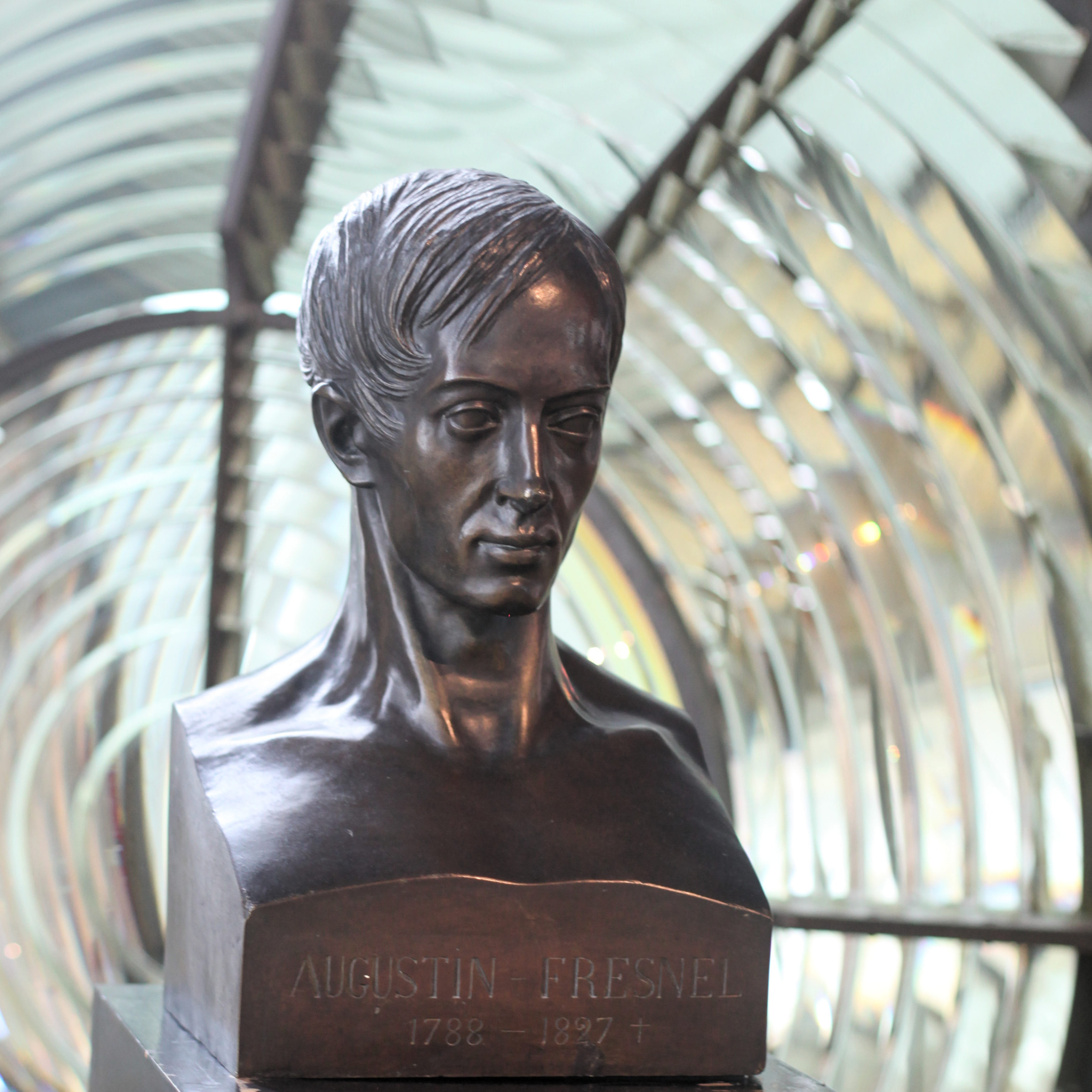
Bust of Augustin Fresnel by David d'Angers (1854), formerly at the lighthouse of Hourtin, Gironde, and now exhibited at the Musée national de la Marine

Fresnel was elected to the Société Philomathique de Paris in April 1819, and in 1822 became one of the editors of the Société's Bulletin des Sciences. As early as May 1817, at Arago's suggestion, Fresnel applied for membership of the Académie des Sciences, but received only one vote. The successful candidate on that occasion was Joseph Fourier. In November 1822, Fourier's elevation to Permanent Secretary of the Académie created a vacancy in the physics section, which was filled in February 1823 by Pierre Louis Dulong, with 36 votes to Fresnel's 20. But in May 1823, after another vacancy was left by the death of Jacques Charles, Fresnel's election was unanimous. In 1824, Fresnel was made a chevalier de la Légion d'honneur (Knight of the Legion of Honour).

Meanwhile, in Britain, the wave theory was yet to take hold; Fresnel wrote to Thomas Young in November 1824, saying in part:

I am far from denying the value that I attach to the praise of English scholars, or pretending that they would not have flattered me agreeably. But for a long time this sensibility, or vanity, which is called the love of glory, has been much blunted in me: I work far less to capture the public's votes than to obtain an inner approbation which has always been the sweetest reward of my efforts. Doubtless I have often needed the sting of vanity to excite me to pursue my researches in moments of disgust or discouragement; but all the compliments I received from MM. Arago, Laplace, and Biot never gave me as much pleasure as the discovery of a theoretical truth and the confirmation of my calculations by experiment.

But "the praise of English scholars" soon followed. On 9 June 1825, Fresnel was made a Foreign Member of the Royal Society of London. In 1827 he was awarded the society's Rumford Medal for the year 1824, "For his Development of the Undulatory Theory as applied to the Phenomena of Polarized Light, and for his various important discoveries in Physical Optics".

A monument to Fresnel at his birthplace was dedicated on 14 September 1884 with a speech by Jules Jamin, Permanent Secretary of the Académie des Sciences. "FRESNEL" is among the 72 names embossed on the Eiffel Tower (on the south-east side, fourth from the left). In the 19th century, as every lighthouse in France acquired a Fresnel lens, every one acquired a bust of Fresnel, seemingly watching over the coastline that he had made safer. The lunar features Promontorium Fresnel and Rimae Fresnel were later named after him, and so was asteroid 10111 Fresnel.

== Decline and death ==
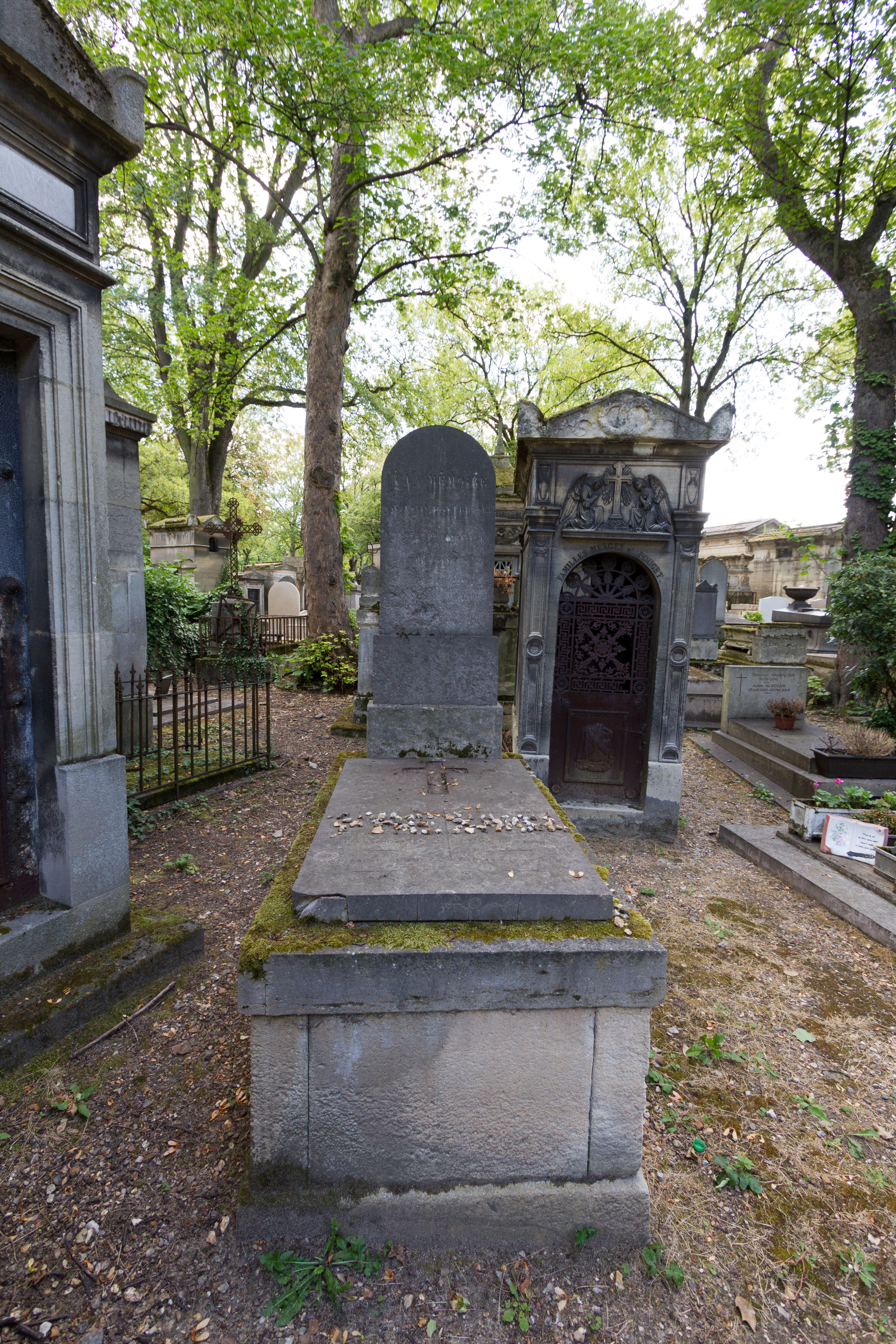
Fresnel's grave at Père Lachaise Cemetery, Paris, photographed in 2018

Fresnel's health, which had always been poor, deteriorated in the winter of 1822–1823, increasing the urgency of his original research, and (in part) preventing him from contributing an article on polarization and double refraction for the Encyclopædia Britannica. The memoirs on circular and elliptical polarization and optical rotation, and on the detailed derivation of the Fresnel equations and their application to total internal reflection, date from this period. In the spring he recovered enough, in his own view, to supervise the lens installation at Cordouan. Soon afterwards, it became clear that his condition was tuberculosis.

In 1824, he was advised that if he wanted to live longer, he needed to scale back his activities. Perceiving his lighthouse work to be his most important duty, he resigned as an examiner at the École Polytechnique, and closed his scientific notebooks. His last note to the Académie, read on 13 June 1825, described the first radiometer and attributed the observed repulsive force to a temperature difference. Although his fundamental research ceased, his advocacy did not; as late as August or September 1826, he found the time to answer Herschel's queries on the wave theory. It was Herschel who recommended Fresnel for the Royal Society's Rumford Medal.

Fresnel's cough worsened in the winter of 1826–1827, leaving him too ill to return to Mathieu in the spring. The Académie meeting of 30 April 1827 was the last that he attended. In early June he was carried to Ville-d'Avray, 12 kilometres (7.5 mi) west of Paris. There his mother joined him. On 6 July, Arago arrived to deliver the Rumford Medal. Sensing Arago's distress, Fresnel whispered that "the most beautiful crown means little, when it is laid on the grave of a friend". Fresnel did not have the strength to reply to the Royal Society. He died eight days later, on Bastille Day.

== Posthumous publications ==
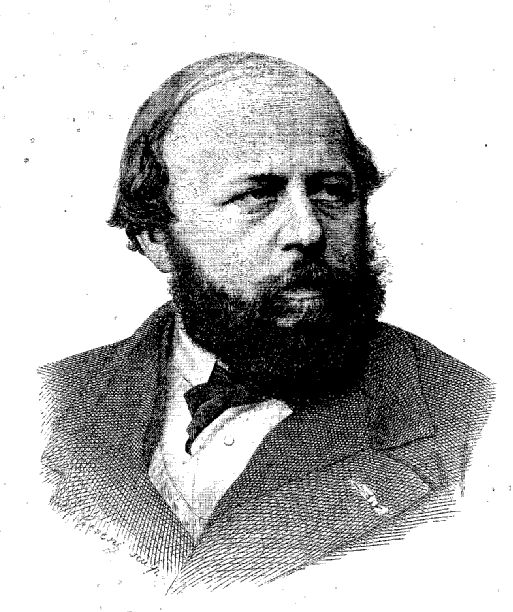
Émile Verdet (1824–1866)

Fresnel's "second memoir" on double refraction was not printed until late 1827, a few months after his death. Until then, the best published source on his work on double refraction was an extract of that memoir, printed in 1822. His final treatment of partial reflection and total internal reflection, read to the Académie in January 1823, was thought to be lost until it was rediscovered among the papers of the deceased Joseph Fourier (1768–1830), and was printed in 1831. Until then, it was known chiefly through an extract printed in 1823 and 1825. The memoir introducing the parallelepiped form of the Fresnel rhomb, read in March 1818, was mislaid until 1846, and then attracted such interest that it was soon republished in English. Most of Fresnel's writings on polarized light before 1821—including his first theory of chromatic polarization (submitted 7 October 1816) and the crucial "supplement" of January 1818 —were not published in full until his Oeuvres complètes ("complete works") began to appear in 1866. The "supplement" of July 1816, proposing the "efficacious ray" and reporting the famous double-mirror experiment, met the same fate, as did the "first memoir" on double refraction.

Publication of Fresnel's collected works was itself delayed by the deaths of successive editors. The task was initially entrusted to Félix Savary, who died in 1841. It was restarted twenty years later by the Ministry of Public Instruction. Of the three editors eventually named in the Oeuvres, Sénarmont died in 1862, Verdet in 1866, and Léonor Fresnel in 1869, by which time only two of the three volumes had appeared. At the beginning of vol. 3 (1870), the completion of the project is described in a long footnote by "J. Lissajous".

Not included in the Oeuvres are two short notes by Fresnel on magnetism, which were discovered among Ampère's manuscripts. In response to Ørsted's discovery of electromagnetism in 1820, Ampère initially supposed that the field of a permanent magnet was due to a macroscopic circulating current. Fresnel suggested instead that there was a microscopic current circulating around each particle of the magnet. In his first note, he argued that microscopic currents, unlike macroscopic currents, would explain why a hollow cylindrical magnet does not lose its magnetism when cut longitudinally. In his second note, dated 5 July 1821, he further argued that a macroscopic current had the counterfactual implication that a permanent magnet should be hot, whereas microscopic currents circulating around the molecules might avoid the heating mechanism. He was not to know that the fundamental units of permanent magnetism are even smaller than molecules. The two notes, together with Ampère's acknowledgment, were eventually published in 1885.

== Lost works ==
Fresnel's essay Rêveries of 1814 has not survived. The article "Sur les Différents Systèmes relatifs à la Théorie de la Lumière" ("On the Different Systems relating to the Theory of Light"), which Fresnel wrote for the newly launched English journal European Review, was received by the publisher's agent in Paris in September 1824. The journal failed before Fresnel's contribution could be published. Fresnel tried unsuccessfully to recover the manuscript. The editors of his collected works were unable to find it, and concluded that it was probably lost.

== Unfinished work ==
=== Aether drag and aether density ===
In 1810, Arago found experimentally that the degree of refraction of starlight does not depend on the direction of the earth's motion relative to the line of sight. In 1818, Fresnel showed that this result could be explained by the wave theory, on the hypothesis that if an object with refractive index $n$ moved at velocity $v$ relative to the external aether (taken as stationary), then the velocity of light inside the object gained the additional component $v(1-1/n^2)$. He supported that hypothesis by supposing that if the density of the external aether was taken as unity, the density of the internal aether was $n^2$, of which the excess, namely $n^2{-}1$, was dragged along at velocity $v$, whence the average velocity of the internal aether was $v(1-1/n^2)$. The factor in parentheses, which Fresnel originally expressed in terms of wavelengths, became known as the Fresnel drag coefficient.

In his analysis of double refraction, Fresnel supposed that the different refractive indices in different directions within the same medium were due to a directional variation in elasticity, not density (because the concept of mass per unit volume is not directional). But in his treatment of partial reflection, he supposed that the different refractive indices of different media were due to different aether densities, not different elasticities.

=== Dispersion ===
The analogy between light waves and transverse waves in elastic solids does not predict dispersion—that is, the frequency-dependence of the speed of propagation, which enables prisms to produce spectra and causes lenses to suffer from chromatic aberration. Fresnel, in De la Lumière and in the second supplement to his first memoir on double refraction, suggested that dispersion could be accounted for if the particles of the medium exerted forces on each other over distances that were significant fractions of a wavelength. Later, more than once, Fresnel referred to the demonstration of this result as being contained in a note appended to his "second memoir" on double refraction. No such note appeared in print, and the relevant manuscripts found after his death showed only that, around 1824, he was comparing refractive indices (measured by Fraunhofer) with a theoretical formula, the meaning of which was not fully explained.

In the 1830s, Fresnel's suggestion was taken up by Cauchy, Baden Powell, and Philip Kelland, and it was found to be tolerably consistent with the variation of refractive indices with wavelength over the visible spectrum for a variety of transparent media. These investigations were enough to show that the wave theory was at least compatible with dispersion; if the model of dispersion was to be accurate over a wider range of frequencies, it needed to be modified so as to take account of resonances within the medium.

=== Conical refraction ===
The analytical complexity of Fresnel's derivation of the ray-velocity surface was an implicit challenge to find a shorter path to the result. This was answered by MacCullagh in 1830, and by William Rowan Hamilton in 1832.

== Legacy ==
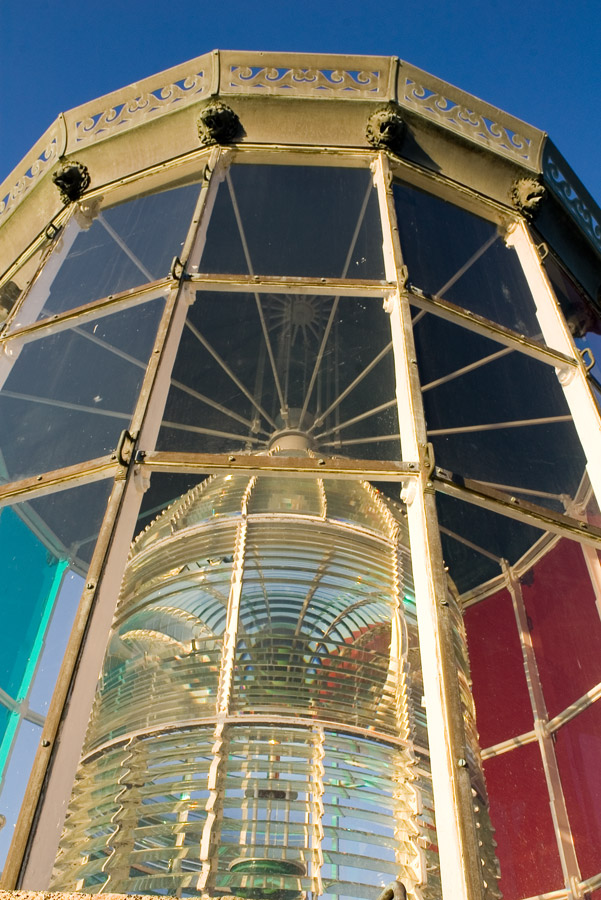
The lantern room of the Cordouan Lighthouse, in which the first Fresnel lens entered service in 1823. The current fixed catadioptric "beehive" lens replaced Fresnel's original rotating lens in 1854.

Within a century of Fresnel's initial stepped-lens proposal, more than 10,000 lights with Fresnel lenses were protecting lives and property around the world. Concerning the other benefits, the science historian Theresa H. Levitt has remarked:

Everywhere I looked, the story repeated itself. The moment a Fresnel lens appeared at a location was the moment that region became linked into the world economy.

In the history of physical optics, Fresnel's successful revival of the wave theory nominates him as the pivotal figure between Newton, who held that light consisted of corpuscles, and James Clerk Maxwell, who established that light waves are electromagnetic. Whereas Albert Einstein described Maxwell's work as "the most profound and the most fruitful that physics has experienced since the time of Newton", commentators of the era between Fresnel and Maxwell made similarly strong statements about Fresnel:

- MacCullagh, as early as 1830, wrote that Fresnel's mechanical theory of double refraction "would do honour to the sagacity of Newton".
- Lloyd, in his Report on the progress and present state of physical optics (1834) for the British Association for the Advancement of Science, surveyed previous knowledge of double refraction and declared:
  The theory of Fresnel to which I now proceed,—and which not only embraces all the known phenomena, but has even outstripped observation, and predicted consequences which were afterwards fully verified,—will, I am persuaded, be regarded as the finest generalization in physical science which has been made since the discovery of universal gravitation.
  In 1841, Lloyd published his Lectures on the Wave-theory of Light, in which he described Fresnel's transverse-wave theory as "the noblest fabric which has ever adorned the domain of physical science, Newton's system of the universe alone excepted".
- William Whewell, in all three editions of his History of the Inductive Sciences (1837, 1847, and 1857), at the end of Book IX, compared the histories of physical astronomy and physical optics and concluded:
  It would, perhaps, be too fanciful to attempt to establish a parallelism between the prominent persons who figure in these two histories. If we were to do this, we must consider Huyghens and Hooke as standing in the place of Copernicus, since, like him, they announced the true theory, but left it to a future age to give it development and mechanical confirmation; Malus and Brewster, grouping them together, correspond to Tycho Brahe and Kepler, laborious in accumulating observations, inventive and happy in discovering laws of phenomena; and Young and Fresnel combined, make up the Newton of optical science.

What Whewell called the "true theory" has since undergone two major revisions. The first, by Maxwell, specified the physical fields whose variations constitute the waves of light. Without the benefit of this knowledge, Fresnel managed to construct the world's first coherent theory of light, showing in retrospect that his methods are applicable to multiple types of waves. The second revision, initiated by Einstein's explanation of the photoelectric effect, supposed that the energy of light waves was divided into quanta, which were eventually identified with particles called photons. But photons did not exactly correspond to Newton's corpuscles; for example, Newton's explanation of ordinary refraction required the corpuscles to travel faster in media of higher refractive index, which photons do not. Neither did photons displace waves; rather, they led to the paradox of wave–particle duality. Moreover, the phenomena studied by Fresnel, which included nearly all the optical phenomena known at his time, are still most easily explained in terms of the wave nature of light. So it was that, as late as 1927, the astronomer Eugène Michel Antoniadi declared Fresnel to be "the dominant figure in optics".

== See also ==
- Birefringence
- Catadioptric system
- Circular polarization
- Fresnel diffraction
- Elliptical polarization
- Fresnel (unit of frequency)
- Fresnel–Arago laws
- Fresnel equations
- Fresnel imager
- Fresnel integral
- Fresnel lantern
- Fresnel lens
- Fresnel number
- Fresnel rhomb
- Fresnel zone
- Fresnel zone antenna
- Fresnel's wave surface
- Fresnel zone plate
- Huygens–Fresnel principle
- Linear polarization
- Optical rotation
- Phasor
- Physical crystallography before X-rays
- Physical optics
- Poisson's /Arago's spot
- Polarization
- Ridged mirror
