= French submarine Fresnel =

Two submarines of the French Navy have borne the name Fresnel:

- French submarine Fresnel (1908), a Pluviôse-class submarine launched in 1908 and sunk in 1915
- French submarine Fresnel (1929), a Redoutable-class submarine launched in 1929 and scuttled in 1942
