= Fresnel–Arago laws =

The Fresnel–Arago laws are three laws which summarise some of the more important properties of interference between light of different states of polarization. Augustin-Jean Fresnel and François Arago, both discovered the laws, which bear their name.

== Statement ==
The laws are as follows:

1. Two orthogonal, coherent linearly polarized waves cannot interfere.
2. Two parallel coherent linearly polarized waves will interfere in the same way as natural light.
3. The two constituent orthogonal linearly polarized states of natural light cannot interfere to form a readily observable interference pattern, even if rotated into alignment (because they are incoherent).
4. A polarized source, split into constituent orthogonal linearly polarized states, rotated back into alignment, will interfere (because they are coherent).
5. Waves passing through birefringent material may display interference dependent on the differences of both path length and speeds.

== Formulation and discussion ==
Consider the interference of two waves given by the form

$$\mathbf{E_1}(\mathbf{r},t)=\mathbf{E}_{01}\cos(\mathbf{k_1\cdot r}-\omega t + \epsilon_1)$$
$$\mathbf{E_2}(\mathbf{r},t)=\mathbf{E}_{02}\cos(\mathbf{k_2\cdot r}-\omega t + \epsilon_2),$$

where the boldface indicates that the relevant quantity is a vector. The intensity of light goes as the electric field absolute square (in fact, $I=\epsilon v \langle \mathbf{\|E\|}^2 \rangle_T$, where the angled brackets denote a time average), and so we just add the fields before squaring them. Extensive algebra yields an interference term in the intensity of the resultant wave, namely:

$$I_{12}=\epsilon v \mathbf{E_{01}\cdot E_{02}}\cos\delta,$$

where the initial fields are involved in a complex dot product $\mathbf{E_{01} \cdot E_{02}}$; the cosine argument is a phase difference $\delta$ arising from a combined path length and initial phase-angle difference is:

$$\delta=\mathbf{k_1\cdot r - k_2 \cdot r}+\epsilon_1-\epsilon_2$$

Now it can be seen that if $\mathbf{E_{01}}$ is perpendicular to $\mathbf{E_{02}}$ (as in the case of the first Fresnel–Arago law), $I_{12}=0$ and there is no interference. On the other hand, if $\mathbf{E_{01}}$ is parallel to $\mathbf{E_{02}}$ (as in the case of the second Fresnel–Arago law), the interference term produces a variation in the light intensity corresponding to $\cos\delta$. Finally, if natural light is decomposed into orthogonal linear polarizations (as in the third Fresnel–Arago law), these states are incoherent, meaning that the phase difference $\delta$ will be fluctuating so quickly and randomly that after time-averaging we have $\langle\cos\delta\rangle_T=0$, so again $I_{12}=0$ and there is no interference (even if $\mathbf{E_{01}}$ is rotated so that it is parallel to $\mathbf{E_{02}}$).

== See also ==
- Unpolarized light
