= Linear polarization =

Electromagnetic radiation special case

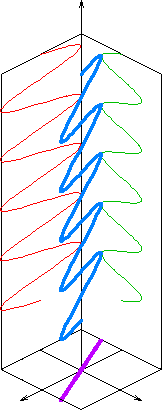
Diagram of the electric field of a light wave (blue), linear-polarized along a plane (purple line), and consisting of two orthogonal, in-phase components (red and green waves)

In electrodynamics, linear polarization or plane polarization of electromagnetic radiation is a confinement of the electric field vector or magnetic field vector to a given plane along the direction of propagation. The term linear polarization (French: polarisation rectiligne) was coined by Augustin-Jean Fresnel in 1822. See polarization and plane of polarization for more information.

The orientation of a linearly polarized electromagnetic wave is defined by the direction of the electric field vector. For example, if the electric field vector is vertical (alternately up and down as the wave travels) the radiation is said to be vertically polarized.

== Mathematical description ==
The classical sinusoidal plane wave solution of the electromagnetic wave equation for the electric and magnetic fields is (cgs units)

$$\mathbf{E} ( \mathbf{r} , t ) = |\mathbf{E}|  \mathrm{Re} \left \{  |\psi\rangle  \exp \left [ i \left  ( kz-\omega t  \right ) \right ] \right \}$$

$$\mathbf{B} ( \mathbf{r} , t ) = \hat { \mathbf{z} } \times \mathbf{E} ( \mathbf{r} , t )/c$$

for the magnetic field, where k is the wavenumber,

$$\omega_{ }^{ } = c k$$

is the angular frequency of the wave, and $c$ is the speed of light.

Here $\mid\mathbf{E}\mid$ is the amplitude of the field and

$$|\psi\rangle  \ \stackrel{\mathrm{def}}{=}\  \begin{pmatrix} \psi_x  \\ \psi_y   \end{pmatrix} =   \begin{pmatrix} \cos\theta \exp \left ( i \alpha_x \right )   \\ \sin\theta \exp \left ( i \alpha_y \right )   \end{pmatrix}$$

is the Jones vector in the x-y plane.

The wave is linearly polarized when the phase angles $\alpha_x^{ } , \alpha_y$ are equal,

$$\alpha_x =  \alpha_y \ \stackrel{\mathrm{def}}{=}\   \alpha$$.

This represents a wave polarized at an angle $\theta$ with respect to the x axis. In that case, the Jones vector can be written

$$|\psi\rangle  =   \begin{pmatrix} \cos\theta    \\ \sin\theta   \end{pmatrix} \exp \left ( i \alpha \right )$$.

The state vectors for linear polarization in x or y are special cases of this state vector.

If unit vectors are defined such that

$$|x\rangle  \ \stackrel{\mathrm{def}}{=}\    \begin{pmatrix} 1    \\ 0  \end{pmatrix}$$

and

$$|y\rangle  \ \stackrel{\mathrm{def}}{=}\    \begin{pmatrix} 0    \\ 1  \end{pmatrix}$$

then the polarization state can be written in the "x-y basis" as

$$|\psi\rangle  =  \cos\theta \exp \left ( i \alpha \right ) |x\rangle + \sin\theta \exp \left ( i \alpha \right ) |y\rangle = \psi_x |x\rangle + \psi_y |y\rangle$$.

== See also ==
- Sinusoidal plane-wave solutions of the electromagnetic wave equation
- Polarization
  - Circular polarization
  - Elliptical polarization
  - Plane of polarization
- Photon polarization
