= Index of physics articles (F) =

The index of physics articles is split into multiple pages due to its size.

To navigate by individual letter use the table of contents below.

== F ==
- F(R) gravity
- F-number
- F-term
- F-theory
- F. David Peat
- F. Dow Smith
- F. J. Duarte
- F. Richard Stephenson
- FBI mnemonics
- FBTR
- FDTD model
- FDTD modeling
- FDTD models
- FFAG accelerator
- FLASH
- FLEX (satellite)
- FLUKA
- FOMP
- FP420 experiment
- FRS Fragment Separator
- FTCS scheme
- FUTBOLIN
- FU Orionis star
- Fabiola Gianotti
- Fabrication and testing of optical components
- Fabry–Pérot interferometer
- Face centred cubic metal
- Facility for Antiproton and Ion Research
- Facility for Rare Isotope Beams
- Factors of polymer weathering
- Faddeev equations
- Faddeev–Popov ghost
- Fahrenheit hydrometer
- Fall cone test
- Falling cat problem
- False sunrise
- False vacuum
- Family (particle physics)
- FanWing
- Fang Lizhi
- Fanning friction factor
- Fanno flow
- Fano noise
- Fano resonance
- Fano resonances
- Far-infrared laser
- Far point
- Farad
- Faraday's law of induction
- Faraday Medal and Prize
- Faraday Society
- Faraday Wheel
- Faraday cage
- Faraday constant
- Faraday cup
- Faraday cup electrometer
- Faraday effect
- Faraday paradox
- Faraday wave
- Farhad Ardalan
- Farrington Daniels
- Fast and Realistic OpenGL Displayer
- Fast atom bombardment
- Fast fission
- Fast ion conductor
- Fast multipole method
- Faster-than-light
- Faster-than-light neutrino anomaly
- Fault current limiter
- Faxén's law
- Fay Ajzenberg-Selove
- Fay Dowker
- Fayet–Iliopoulos D-term
- Fazle Hussain
- Featherstone's algorithm
- Federico Capasso
- Feedback linearization
- Feedback topology
- Feigenbaum constants
- Feigenbaum function
- Feinberg reinterpretation principle
- Felice Fontana
- Felici's law
- Felix Andries Vening Meinesz
- Felix Berezin
- Felix Bloch
- Felix Ehrenhaft
- Felix Maria von Exner-Ewarten
- Felix Villars
- Felix Weinberg
- Feng Duan
- Feodosy Krasovsky
- Ferdinand Brickwedde
- Ferdinand Kurlbaum
- Ferdynand Antoni Ossendowski
- Ferenc Krausz
- Fereydoon Family
- Fermat's principle
- Fermi's golden rule
- Fermi's interaction
- Fermi acceleration
- Fermi contact interaction
- Fermi coupling constant
- Fermi energy
- Fermi gas
- Fermi level
- Fermi liquid theory
- Fermi point
- Fermi problem
- Fermi resonance
- Fermi surface
- Fermi surface of superconducting cuprates
- Fermilab
- Fermilab Holometer
- Fermilab E-906/SeaQuest
- Fermion
- Fermion doubling
- Fermionic condensate
- Fermionic field
- Fermi–Dirac statistics
- Fermi–Pasta–Ulam–Tsingou problem
- Fermi–Walker differentiation
- Fermi–Walker transport
- Fernand Holweck
- Fernando Quevedo
- Fernando Sanford
- Ferrimagnetism
- Ferrite (magnet)
- Ferroelectret
- Ferroelectricity
- Ferrofluid
- Ferroics
- Ferromagnetic interaction
- Ferromagnetic material properties
- Ferromagnetic resonance
- Ferromagnetism
- Fertile material
- Feryal Özel
- Feshbach–Fano partitioning
- Fessenden oscillator
- Few-body systems
- Feynman's Lost Lecture: The Motion of Planets Around the Sun
- Feynman checkerboard
- Feynman diagram
- Feynman graph
- Feynman parametrization
- Feynman slash notation
- Feynman sprinkler
- Feza Gürsey
- Fiber Bragg grating
- Fiber laser
- Fibre optic gyroscope
- Fick's laws of diffusion
- Fictitious force
- Field-emission electric propulsion
- Field-reversed configuration
- Field-theoretic simulation
- Field (physics)
- Field aligned irregularities
- Field electron emission
- Field emission microscopy
- Field emission probes
- Field equation
- Field of Streams
- Field rate
- Field strength
- Fierz identity
- Fifth force
- Figure-8 laser
- Figure of the Earth
- Figuring
- Filament propagation
- Film-forming agent
- Film temperature
- Filter (large eddy simulation)
- Filter (signal processing)
- Fin (extended surface)
- Fine-structure constant
- Fine-tuned universe
- Fine-tuning
- Fine structure
- Fineness ratio
- Finite-difference frequency-domain method
- Finite-difference time-domain method
- Finite-volume method
- Finite potential well
- Finite strain theory
- Fiodar Fiodaraŭ
- Fiorella Terenzi
- Fire
- Fire point
- Fire whirl
- Firmin Abauzit
- First-order fluid
- First-order transition
- First Step to Nobel Prize in Physics
- First class constraint
- First law of thermodynamics
- First quantization
- First superstring revolution
- Fischler–Susskind mechanism
- Fissile
- Fission Product Pilot Plant
- Fission products (by element)
- FitzHugh–Nagumo model
- Fixed-focus lens
- Fixed-pattern noise
- Fixture unit
- Fizeau experiment
- Fizeau's measurement of the speed of light in air
- Fizz keeper
- Flack parameter
- Flame
- Flame detector
- Flammability
- Flammability limit
- Flap (aircraft)
- Flap back
- Flare spray
- Flash evaporation
- Flash freezing
- Flash point
- Flat-field correction
- Flat lens
- Flat weighting
- Flatness (cosmology)
- Flatness (liquids)
- Flatness problem
- Flattening
- Flavor-changing neutral current
- Flavour (particle physics)
- Flavour quantum number
- Flavour quantum numbers
- Fleming's left-hand rule for motors
- Fleming's right hand rule
- Flerovium
- Fletcher–Munson curves
- Flexible SPC water model
- Flexiverse
- Flexural rigidity
- Flexural strength
- Flicker noise
- Flight
- Flight dynamics (fixed wing aircraft)
- Flipped SO(10)
- Flipped SU(5)
- Float-zone silicon
- Floating water bridge
- Flocculation
- Floer homology
- Flood
- Florentina Mosora
- Floris Nollet
- Flory–Huggins solution theory
- Flory–Rehner equation
- Flow, Turbulence and Combustion
- Flow coefficient
- Flow conditions
- Flow limiter
- Flow measurement
- Flow sensor
- Flow separation
- Flow through nozzles
- Flow tracer
- Flow velocity
- Flow visualization
- Flowing-afterglow mass spectrometry
- Floyd K. Richtmyer
- Floyd Richtmyer
- Fluctuation-dissipation theorem
- Fluctuation theorem
- Fluence
- Fluid
- Fluid Dynamics Prize (APS)
- Fluid dynamic gauge
- Fluid dynamics
- Fluid mechanics
- Fluid meter
- Fluid parcel
- Fluid pipe
- Fluid pressure
- Fluid solution
- Fluid statics
- Fluid theory of electricity
- Fluidics
- Fluidyne engine
- Fluid–structure interaction
- Fluorescence
- Fluorescence spectroscopy
- Fluoride volatility
- Fluoroposs
- Flux
- Flux-Corrected Transport
- Flux limiter
- Flux linkage
- Flux method
- Flux pinning
- Flux quantization
- Flux tube
- Fluxoid
- Fluxon
- Flyby anomaly
- Flying-spot scanner
- Flying wing
- Focal length
- Fock matrix
- Fock space
- Fock state
- Fock–Lorentz symmetry
- Focus (optics)
- Foe (unit)
- Fog bow
- Folded optics
- Foldy–Wouthuysen transformation
- Foot-lambert
- Foot per second
- For All Practical Purposes
- Forbidden mechanism
- Forbush decrease
- Force
- Force-free magnetic field
- Force between magnets
- Force carrier
- Force density
- Force field (chemistry)
- Force field (physics)
- Ford viscosity cup
- Forecasting complexity
- Form factor (quantum field theory)
- Form factor (electronics)
- Form factor (radiative transfer)
- Forschungsreaktor 2 (FR2)
- Forschungszentrum Jülich
- Forward-swept wing
- Forward scatter
- Forward scattering alignment
- Fossil stellar magnetic field
- Foster's reactance theorem
- Fotini Markopoulou-Kalamara
- Foucault pendulum
- Foucault's measurements of the speed of light
- Fouling
- Foundational Questions Institute
- Foundations of Physics
- Four-acceleration
- Four-bar linkage
- Four-current
- Four-dimensional space
- Four-fermion interactions
- Four-force
- Four-frequency
- Four-gradient
- Four-momentum
- Four-tensor
- Four-vector
- Four-velocity
- Fourier optics
- Fourier pair
- Fourier transform infrared spectroscopy
- Fourier transform ion cyclotron resonance
- Fractal cosmology
- Fractal derivative
- Fractal dimension
- Fractional Schrödinger equation
- Fractional anisotropy
- Fractional quantum Hall effect
- Fractional supersymmetry
- Fractoluminescence
- Fracton
- Fracture mechanics
- Fracture toughening mechanisms
- Fragment separator
- Frame-dragging
- Frame fields in general relativity
- Frame of reference
- Fran Bošnjaković
- Frances Hellman
- Francesco Calogero
- Francesco Carlini
- Francesco Maria Grimaldi
- Francesco Rossetti
- Francesco Sannino
- Francesco Zantedeschi
- Francis Allotey
- Francis Birch (geophysicist)
- Francis Bitter
- Francis Crick
- Francis Eugene Nipher
- Francis Everitt
- Francis F. Chen
- Francis G. Slack
- Francis H. Harlow
- Francis Perrin
- Francis Robbins Upton
- Francis Sears
- Francis Simon
- Francis Wheeler Loomis
- Francisco José Ynduráin
- Franck Report
- Franck–Condon principle
- Franck–Hertz experiment
- Franco-British Nuclear Forum
- Franco Rasetti
- Frank B. Jewett
- Frank Benford
- Frank Close
- Frank Edward Smith
- Frank Elmore Ross
- Frank Farmer (physicist)
- Frank Haig
- Frank Hereford (University of Virginia)
- Frank Isakson Prize for Optical Effects in Solids
- Frank J. Low
- Frank J. Tipler
- Frank N. von Hippel
- Frank Nabarro
- Frank Oppenheimer
- Frank Press
- Frank Verstraete
- Frank Wilczek
- Franklin L. West
- Franklin S. Cooper
- Frank–Tamm formula
- Frans Michel Penning
- Franssen effect
- František Běhounek
- František Josef Gerstner
- František Koláček
- František Záviška
- Franz Ernst Neumann
- Franz Melde
- Franz N. D. Kurie
- Franz Ollendorff
- Franz S. Exner
- Franz Wegner
- Franz Wittmann (physicist)
- Franz–Keldysh effect
- François Arago
- François Englert
- François Frenkiel
- Frascati Tokamak Upgrade
- Fraser Filter
- Fraunhofer diffraction
- Fraunhofer distance
- Fraunhofer lines
- Frazil ice
- Fred Adams
- Fred Alan Wolf
- Fred Begay
- Fred Cummings
- Fred E. Wright
- Fred Espenak
- Fred Hoyle
- Fred Kavli
- Frederick Charles Frank
- Frederick Eugene Wright
- Frederick Grover
- Frederick Guthrie
- Frederick James Hargreaves
- Frederick Lindemann, 1st Viscount Cherwell
- Frederick Reines
- Frederick Rossini
- Frederick Seitz
- Frederick Sumner Brackett
- Frederick Thomas Trouton
- Frederick Vine
- Fredkin finite nature hypothesis
- Free-air gravity anomaly
- Free-electron laser
- Free-fall atomic model
- FreeFOAM
- FreeON
- Free body
- Free body diagram
- Free boundary problem
- Free convective layer
- Free electron model
- Free entropy
- Free expansion
- Free fall
- Free field
- Free induction decay
- Free molecular flow
- Free particle
- Free space
- Free spectral range
- Free streaming
- Free surface
- Free surface effect
- Free will theorem
- Freeman Dyson
- Freeze thaw resistance
- Freezing
- Frenet–Serret formulas
- Frenkel defect
- Frequency
- Frequency-resolved optical gating
- Frequency agility
- Frequency classification of plasmas
- Frequency comb
- Frequency domain sensor
- Frequency range
- Frequency spectrum
- Fresnel (frequency)
- Fresnel Imager
- Fresnel diffraction
- Fresnel equations
- Fresnel mirror
- Fresnel number
- Fresnel rhomb
- Fresnel zone
- Fresnel–Arago laws
- Fretting
- Freund–Rubin compactification
- Friction
- Friction loss
- Friedel Sellschop
- Friedmann equations
- Friedmann–Lemaître–Robertson–Walker metric
- Friedrich Bopp
- Friedrich Burmeister (geophysicist)
- Friedrich Carl Alwin Pockels
- Friedrich Dessauer
- Friedrich Ernst Dorn
- Friedrich Hasenöhrl
- Friedrich Hopfner
- Friedrich Hund
- Friedrich Kohlrausch
- Friedrich Kottler
- Friedrich Paschen
- Friedrich Risner
- Friedrich Robert Helmert
- Friedwardt Winterberg
- Fringe shift
- Frisch–Peierls memorandum
- Fritjof Capra
- Frits Zernike
- Fritz-Albert Popp
- Fritz Fischer (physicist)
- Fritz Houtermans
- Fritz John
- Fritz London
- Fritz Peter Schäfer
- Fritz Reiche
- Fritz Sauter
- Fritz Ursell
- Fritz Zwicky
- Frog battery
- From Eternity to Here
- Front velocity
- Frontier molecular orbital theory
- Frontiers of Physics in China
- Frost flower (sea ice)
- Froude number
- Froude resistance curve
- Froude–Krylov force
- Frédéric Joliot-Curie
- Fréedericksz transition
- Fubini–Study metric
- Fuel Cells (journal)
- Fuel efficiency
- Fuel mass fraction
- Fuel temperature coefficient of reactivity
- Fugacity
- Fujikawa method
- Fujita scale
- Fujiwhara effect
- Fukushima's Theorem
- Full-Scale Tunnel
- Fulvio Melia
- Functional derivative
- Functional integration
- Functions of state
- Fundamental Fysiks Group
- Fundamental frequency
- Fundamental interaction
- Fundamental thermodynamic relation
- Fundamental unit
- Fundamentals of Physics
- Furuta pendulum
- Fusion Technology Center
- Fusion energy gain factor
- Fusion for Energy
- Fusion power
- Fusion rocket
- Fusion rules
- Fusion temperature
- Fusion torch
- Fusor
- Future of an expanding universe
- Fuzzball (string theory)
- Fyodor Grigoryevich Reshetnikov
- Fyodor Luzhin
- Fåhræus–Lindqvist effect
- Félix Savart
- Förster coupling
