= FTG =

FTG may refer to:

- FTG (band), a Malaysian thrash metal band
- Far-right Tracking Group, an online activist group in South Korea
- Ferdinand Tönnies Society (German: Ferdinand-Tönnies-Gesellschaft), a German sociological research society
- Ferntree Gully railway station, in Victoria, Australia
- Fixed turbine geometry in a turbocharger
- Front Range Airport (current name: Colorado Air and Space Port), an airport near Aurora, Colorado, United States that opened in 1984

== See also ==
- FDG (disambiguation)
