= WAPP =

WAPP or Wapp may refer to:

- WAPP-LP, a radio station (100.3 FM) licensed to Westhampton, New York, United States
- WKTU, a radio station (103.5 FM) licensed to Lake Success, New York, United States, which formerly used the call sign WAPP-FM
- A variant of the open-source software program BAPP
- Pattimura International Airport (ICAO:WAPP), Indonesia
- Washington Progressive Party, a political party in Washington state, United States
- West African Power Pool, a cooperation of the national electricity companies in Western Africa
- Women Against Private Police, a civil rights organization in Baltimore, Maryland, United States

== People with the surname ==
- Josephine Myers-Wapp (1912–2014), Comanche weaver and educator
- Thomas Wapp (born 1972), Swiss badminton player
