= FAPP =

FAPP may refer to:

- Filtered Air Positive Pressure
- For All Practical Purposes
- FreeBSD, Apache, PostgreSQL, PHP - See BAPP
- Polokwane International Airport (ICAO: FAPP)
