= Naoshi =

- Gender: Male

Origin
- Origin: Japanese
- Meaning: Different meanings depending on the kanji used

Naoshi (written: 直 or 直志) is a masculine Japanese given name. Notable people with the name include:

- Naoshi Arakawa (新川 直司), Japanese manga artist
- Naoshi Fukushima (福島 直; 1925–2003), Japanese physicist
- Naoshi Komi (古味 直志; born 1986), Japanese manga artist
- Naoshi Koriyama (郡山 直; born 1926), Japanese poet
- Naoshi Mizuta (水田 直志; born 1972), Japanese video game composer and musician
- Naoshi Nakamura (中村 直志; born 1979), Japanese footballer
- Naoshi Ohara (小原 直; 1877–1967), Japanese politician

== Fictional characters ==
- Naoshi Usui, a major antagonist in My Happy Marriage
