= FDG =

FDG may refer to:

== Politics ==
- Democratic Forces of Guiana (French: Forces democratiques de Guyane), a political party in French Guiana
- Left Front (France) or Front de gauche, an electoral federation
- Youth Front (Fronte della Gioventù), the youth wing of the neofascist Italian Social Movement

== Science ==
- Fluorodeoxyglucose (18F)
- Fluid dynamic gauge

== Other uses ==
- Fording Canadian Coal Trust, a Canadian corporation (2003–2008)
- Friedrich-Dessauer-Gymnasium, Frankfurt, a school in Germany
- Functional discourse grammar, a linguistic model
