= FBI mnemonics =

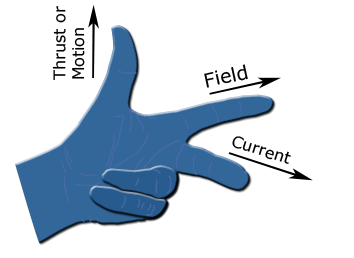
Left hand rule

Alternate representation of LHR

The various FBI mnemonics (for electric motors) show the direction of the force on a conductor carrying a current in a magnetic field as predicted by Fleming's left hand rule for motors and Faraday's law of induction.

Other mnemonics exist that use a right hand rule for predicting resulting motion from a preexisting current and field.

== Configuration, using the left hand ==
=== 'FBI' ===
The left hand is held with the thumb, first finger and second finger mutually at right angles.

- The Thumb represents F - Thrust (or resulting Motion).
- The First finger represents B - Field.
- The Second finger represents I or V - Current (in the classical direction, from positive to negative).

== Configuration, using the right hand ==
Other sources use the right hand to predict force, though the fingers used vary:

=== 'FIB' ===
- Thumb = F ("thrust")
- Index finger = I or V
- Middle finger ("Birdie") = B

=== 'IBF' ===
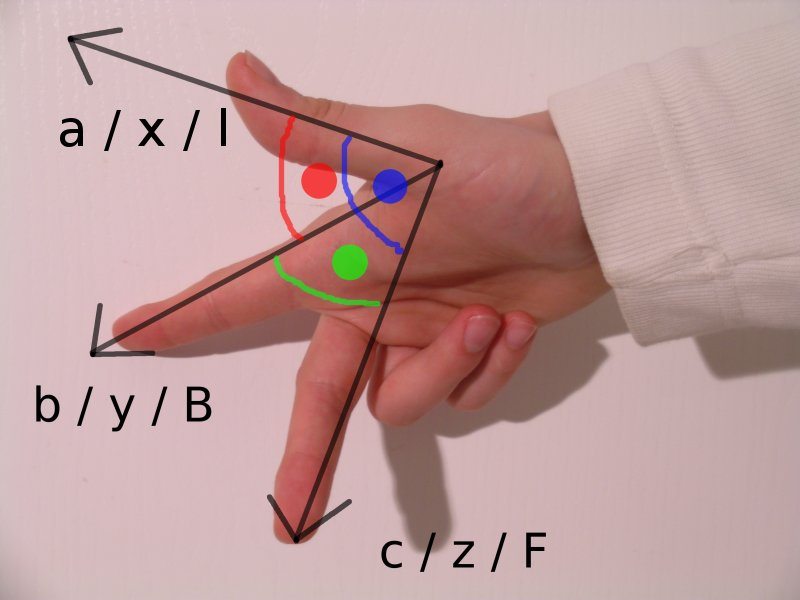
Right-handed alternate - 'IBF'.

In this alternative, some versions recommend not extending the middle finger, but instead imagining the force coming from the palm of the hand.

- Thumb = I or V
- Index finger = B
- Middle finger = F

== Other frequently confused rules ==
=== Prediction of direction of field ('B') ===
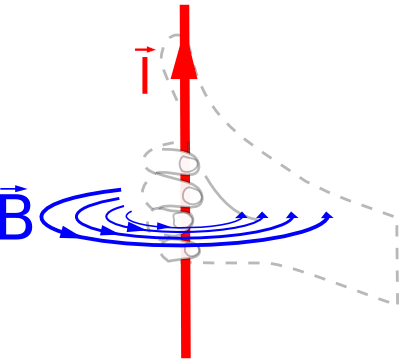
Prediction of direction of field ('B').

The rules above are usually used to predict 'F' based upon 'B' and 'I' - the force on a moving charge when moving through a field, whether or not the charge is carried in a wire. However, this rule should not be confused with a different right hand grip rule for the prediction of the direction of a field ('B') produced by current ('I') traveling through a wire.

== Symmetry ==
Vector	Left-Motor or Right-Generator	Left-Motor or Right-Generator	Left-Motor or Right-Generator	Right-Motor or Left-Generator	Right-Motor or Left-Generator	Right-Motor or Left-Generator
B or Field	First or Index	Thumb	Fingers or Palm	First or Index	Thumb	Fingers or Palm
I or Current (+ to - flow)	Fingers or Palm	First or Index	Thumb	Thumb	Fingers or Palm	First or Index
Force, Motion, or Thrust	Thumb	Fingers or Palm	First or Index	Fingers or Palm	First or Index	Thumb
