= Four-tensor =

Abbreviation in the fields of special and general relativity

In physics, specifically for special relativity and general relativity, a four-tensor is an abbreviation for a tensor in a four-dimensional spacetime.

== Generalities ==
General four-tensors are usually written in tensor index notation as

$$A^{\mu_1,\mu_2,...,\mu_n}_{\;\nu_1,\nu_2,...,\nu_m}$$

with the indices taking integer values from 0 to 3, with 0 for the timelike components and 1, 2, 3 for spacelike components. There are n contravariant indices and m covariant indices.

In special and general relativity, many four-tensors of interest are first order (four-vectors) or second order, but higher-order tensors occur. Examples are listed next.

In special relativity, the vector basis can be restricted to being orthonormal, in which case all four-tensors transform under Lorentz transformations. In general relativity, more general coordinate transformations are necessary since such a restriction is not in general possible.

== Examples ==
=== First-order tensors ===
In special relativity, one of the simplest non-trivial examples of a four-tensor is the four-displacement

$$x^\mu = \left(x^0, x^1, x^2, x^3\right) = (ct,x,y,z)$$

a four-tensor with contravariant rank 1 and covariant rank 0. Four-tensors of this kind are usually known as four-vectors. Here the component x^{0} = ct gives the displacement of a body in time (coordinate time t is multiplied by the speed of light c so that x^{0} has dimensions of length). The remaining components of the four-displacement form the spatial displacement vector x = (x^{1}, x^{2}, x^{3}).

The four-momentum for massive or massless particles is

$$p^\mu = \left(p^0, p^1, p^2, p^3\right) = \left(\frac{1}{c} E, p_x, p_y, p_z\right)$$

combining its energy (divided by c) p^{0} = E/c and 3-momentum p = (p^{1}, p^{2}, p^{3}).

For a particle with invariant mass $m_0$, also known as rest mass, four momentum is defined by

$$p^\mu = m_0 \frac{dx^\mu}{d\tau}$$

with $\tau$ the proper time of the particle.

The relativistic mass is $m = \gamma m_o$ with Lorentz factor

$$\gamma = \frac{1}{\sqrt{1 - \frac{v^2}{c^2}}} = \frac{1}{\sqrt{1 - \beta^2}} = \frac{dt}{d\tau}$$

=== Second-order tensors ===
The Minkowski metric tensor with an orthonormal basis for the (−+++) convention is

$$\eta^{\mu \nu} = \begin{pmatrix} -1 & 0 & 0 & 0 \\ 0 & 1 & 0 & 0 \\ 0 & 0 & 1 & 0 \\ 0 & 0 & 0 & 1 \end{pmatrix}\,$$

used for calculating the line element and raising and lowering indices. The above applies to Cartesian coordinates. In general relativity, the metric tensor is given by much more general expressions for curvilinear coordinates.

The angular momentum L = x ∧ p of a particle with relativistic mass m and relativistic momentum p (as measured by an observer in a lab frame) combines with another vector quantity N = mx − pt (without a standard name) in the relativistic angular momentum tensor

$$M^{\mu\nu} = \begin{pmatrix}
0     & -N^1 c  & -N^2 c  & -N^3 c \\
N^1 c &  0      &  L^{12} & -L^{31} \\
N^2 c & -L^{12} &  0      &  L^{23} \\
N^3 c &  L^{31} & -L^{23} &  0
\end{pmatrix}$$

with components

$$M^{\alpha\beta} = X^\alpha P^\beta - X^\beta P^\alpha$$

The stress–energy tensor of a continuum or field generally takes the form of a second-order tensor, and usually denoted by T. The timelike component corresponds to energy density (energy per unit volume), the mixed spacetime components to momentum density (momentum per unit volume), and the purely spacelike parts to the 3d stress tensor.

The electromagnetic field tensor combines the electric field and E and magnetic field B

$$F^{\mu\nu} = \begin{pmatrix}
0 & -E_x/c & -E_y/c & -E_z/c \\
E_x/c &      0 &   -B_z &    B_y \\
E_y/c &    B_z &      0 &   -B_x \\
E_z/c &   -B_y &    B_x &      0
\end{pmatrix}$$

The electromagnetic displacement tensor combines the electric displacement field D and magnetic field intensity H as follows

$$\mathcal{D}^{\mu\nu} =
\begin{pmatrix}
0    & -D_xc & -D_yc & -D_zc \\
D_xc &     0 &  -H_z &   H_y \\
D_yc &   H_z &     0 &  -H_x \\
D_zc &  -H_y &   H_x & 0
\end{pmatrix}.$$

The magnetization-polarization tensor combines the P and M fields

$$\mathcal{M}^{\mu\nu} =
\begin{pmatrix}
0      & P_xc  &  P_yc &   P_zc \\
- P_xc & 0     & - M_z &   M_y  \\
- P_yc & M_z   & 0     & - M_x  \\
- P_zc & - M_y & M_x   & 0
\end{pmatrix},$$

The three field tensors are related by

$$\mathcal{D}^{\mu \nu} = \frac{1}{\mu_{0}} F^{\mu \nu} - \mathcal{M}^{\mu \nu} \,$$

which is equivalent to the definitions of the D and H fields.

The electric dipole moment d and magnetic dipole moment μ of a particle are unified into a single tensor

$$\sigma^{\mu\nu} =
\begin{pmatrix}
0     & d_x & d_y & d_z \\
-  d_x & 0      & \mu_z / c  &   - \mu_y/c    \\
-  d_y & - \mu_z / c  & 0      & \mu_x /c  \\
-  d_z & \mu_y / c  & - \mu_x /c  & 0
\end{pmatrix},$$

The Ricci curvature tensor is another second-order tensor.

=== Higher-order tensors ===
In general relativity, there are curvature tensors which tend to be higher order, such as the Riemann curvature tensor and Weyl curvature tensor which are both fourth order tensors.

== See also ==
- Spin tensor
- Tetrad (general relativity)
