= Flory–Rehner equation =

Equation in polymer science

In polymer science Flory–Rehner equation is an equation that describes the mixing of polymer and liquid molecules as predicted by the equilibrium swelling theory of Flory and Rehner. It describes the equilibrium swelling of a lightly crosslinked polymer in terms of crosslink density and the quality of the solvent.

The Flory–Rehner equation is written as:

$$-\left[ \ln{\left(1 - \nu_2\right)}+\nu_2+ \chi_1 \nu_2^2 \right] = V_1 n \left(\nu_2^\frac{1}{3}-\frac{\nu_2}{2}\right)$$

where, $\nu_2$ is the volume fraction of polymer in the swollen mass, $V_1$ the molar volume of the solvent, $n$ is the number of network chain segments bounded on both ends by crosslinks, and $\chi_1$ is the Flory solvent-polymer interaction term.

In its full form, the Flory–Rehner equation is written as:

$$-\left[ \ln{\left(1 - \nu_2\right)}+\nu_2+ \chi_1 \nu_2^2 \right] = \frac{V_1}{\bar{\nu}M_c} \left(1-\frac{M_c}{M}\frac{f}{f - 2}\right) \left(\nu_2^\frac{1}{3}-\frac{\nu_2}{2}\right)$$

where $\bar{\nu}$ is the specific volume of the polymer; $M$ is the primary molecular mass; $f$ is the crosslink functionality (4 for perfect network); and $M_c$ is the average molecular mass between crosslinks or the network parameter.

== Flory–Rehner theory ==
The Flory–Rehner theory gives the change of free energy upon swelling of the polymer gel similar to the Flory–Huggins solution theory:

$$\Delta F = \Delta F_\mathrm{mix} + \Delta F_\mathrm{elastic}$$.

The theory considers forces arising from three sources:

1. The entropy change $\Delta S_\mathrm{mix}$ caused by mixing of polymer and solvent
2. The heat of mixing of polymer and solvent $\Delta U_\mathrm{mix}$, which may be positive, negative, or zero so, that $\Delta F_\mathrm{mix}=\Delta U_\mathrm{mix}-T\Delta S_\mathrm{mix}$
3. The entropy change caused by reduction in numbers of possible chain conformations via swelling $\Delta F_\mathrm{elastic}$

The Flory–Rehner equation was used to model the cooking of steaks in a journal article in 2020

== Bibliography ==
- Flory, Paul; Rehner, John (1943). "Statistical mechanics of cross-linked polymer networks II. Swelling". J. Chem. Phys. 11 (11): 521–526. Bibcode:1943JChPh..11..521F. doi:10.1063/1.1723792.
- Sperling, Leslie H. (2006). Introduction to Physical Polymer Science (4th ed.). Bethlehem, PA: John Wiley & Sons. ISBN 978-0-471-70606-9.
- Alger, Mark (1997). Polymer Science Dictionary (2nd ed.). London: Chapman & Hall. ISBN 978-0-412-60870-4.
