= Fizz-Keeper =

Type of closure and hand pump intended for soft drink bottles

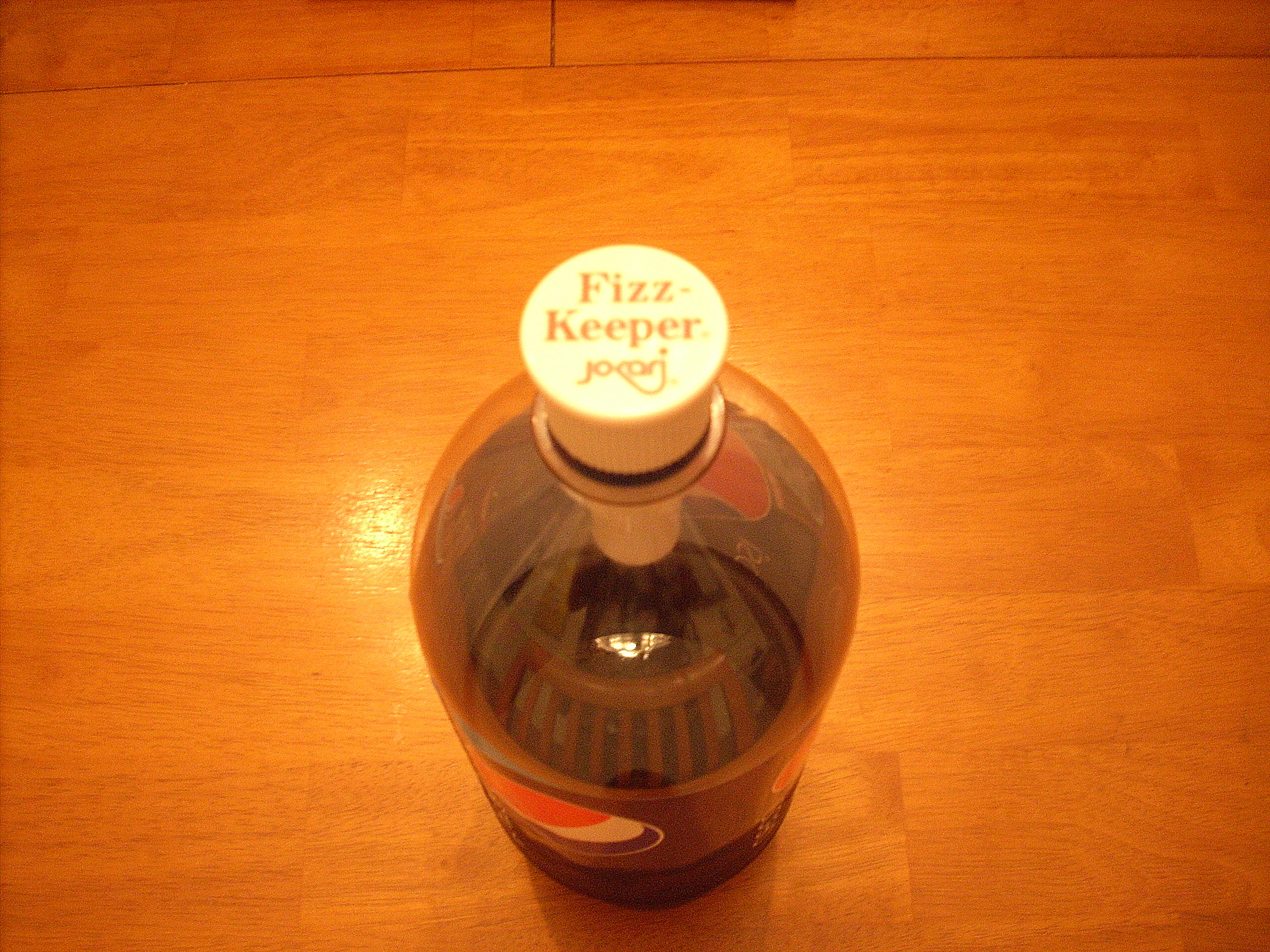
A Fizz-Keeper on a Pepsi bottle

A Fizz-Keeper is a type of closure that is marketed as a way to keep carbonation in soft drinks. It consists of a small round hand pump that is screwed onto the top of a plastic soft drink bottle, which is then used to pump air into the bottle, preventing the drink from going flat.

Research into the Fizz-Keeper's mechanisms and processes has shown that the Fizz-Keeper, let alone pressurizing a soda bottle, does not actually prevent loss of carbonation, with its marketed claims being dismissed as pseudoscience.

== Description ==
The first Fizz-Keeper-like device was patented in 1926 by G. Staunton. T.R. Robinson and M.B. Beyer patented the Fizz-Keeper itself in 1988, without claiming in the patent that the device maintained a soft drink's carbonation.

Several styles of device exist, from the plain piston pump to devices incorporating a bulb and a latch and hinge device to allow liquid to be poured out of a spout without removing the Fizz-Keeper from the bottle.

== Research ==
The kinetics of the loss of "fizz" (CO_{2}) after pouring out part of the liquid and resealing the bottle is somewhat complicated, but the computation of the final equilibrium concentration of CO_{2} in the liquid and the gas phase can be done (with or without pumping air into the bottle) using Dalton's law (a consequence of ideal gas theory). This shows that the equilibrium CO_{2} concentrations are independent of the air pressure -- the device does not prevent loss of CO_{2} from the liquid. This conclusion does not require knowledge of Dalton's law; it can be seen directly from the fundamental assumption of ideal gas theory, that molecules in the gas phase do not interact with one another. This principle implies that the behavior of the CO_{2} is completely independent of the behavior of the air (nitrogen and oxygen), or of how much air is present: pumping air into the bottle has no effect whatsoever on the CO_{2}. There is more evidence of this in Henry's Law, which shows that partial pressure in the container must be not only restored, but with the same gas. The liquid is far more easily infused under pressure, but once the liquid is exposed to atmospheric pressure, it immediately begins to out-gas. Studies of the kinetics, however, do report that pumping in air pressure slows down the rate at which dissolved CO_{2} comes out of solution. Apparently the application of the Fizz-Keeper with pressurized air can extend this process for a short time, but not for days. Rohrig reports that this can be confirmed by experimentation.
