= Fraser filter =

A Fraser filter, named after Douglas Fraser, is typically used in geophysics when displaying VLF data. It is effectively the first derivative of the data.

If $f(i) = f_i$ represents the collected data then $average_{12}=\frac{f_1 + f_2}{2}$ is the average of two values. Consider this value to be plotted between point 1 and point 2 and do the same with points 3 and 4: $average_{34}=\frac{f_3 + f_4}{2}$

If $\Delta x$ represents the space between each station along the line then $\frac{average_{12}-average_{34}}{2 \Delta x}=\frac{(f_1 + f_2)-(f_3 + f_4)}{4 \Delta x}$ is the Fraser Filter of those four values.

Since $4 \Delta x$ is constant, it can be ignored and the Fraser filter considered to be $(f_1 + f_2)-(f_3 + f_4)$.
