= Michał Gryziński =

Polish physicist

- Born: September 29, 1930; Warsaw, Poland
- Died: June 1, 2004 (aged 73)
- Education: Warsaw Institute of Technology; Institute of Nuclear Studies
- Children: 2
- Scientific career
- Fields: Plasma physics
- Workplaces: Institute of Nuclear Studies

Michał Gryziński (29 September 1930 - 1 June 2004) was a Polish nuclear physicist specialized in plasma physics. In 1965 he developed some widely used empirical models to reproduce some of the results of electron scattering experiments.

== Life ==
Michał Gryziński was born in 1930, son of Jan and Stefania, in Anin, Warsaw, Poland.

He studied in Władysław IV school in Warsaw and obtained a master's degree in engineering from Warsaw University of Technology in 1955. He would have then started working with Ignacy Złotowski, and then moved to work at the Institute of Nuclear Studies (IBJ) in Świerk, Otwock County, Poland, under the supervision of Andrzej Sołtan. He wrote a doctorate thesis in theoretical physics at IBJ in 1965, but was rejected, partially for his critique to quantum mechanics. He never obtained a doctorate degree.

He later initiated research in plasma devices. From 1959 onward, he led the plasma research group at IBJ. In 1973, when a department for plasma physics was established, he was appointed as its head. He held this position until 1981. Michał's group collaborated with the Bemowo institute in north Warsaw to construct one of the world's largest plasma focus devices, known as PF-1000. Additionally, his team employed ion beams to alter the surfaces of solid objects.

Michał had two children's, Hanna and Michał A.Gryziński.

Gryziński died from cancer in 2004.

In Gryziński's obituary, his colleague Eryk Infeld, son of Leopold Infeld, writes that Gryziński was successful with his classical methods, yet controversial for constantly advocating the superiority of classical mechanics over quantum theory.

== Work ==
Michał Gryziński worked in a hot plasma group on an approach to nuclear fusion which has later evolved to what is currently known as dense plasma focus. During this time he developed a device called an Ionotron, a kind of plasma accelerator; this device was later adapted by others to modify surfaces with pulsed ion beams. His experimental and theoretical consideration have led him 1957 to emphasize the importance of the orbital motion of electrons of a medium for stopping of slow charged particles. This work led him to a series of articles in 1965 about the problem of scattering with classical approximation of dynamics of the electrons.

The first three papers in 1965 developed a model electron scattering from atoms based on an empirical form for the velocity of electrons in the atom. These results where widely used for computing cross sections. For plasma research the inelastic scattering cross-section for electrons from atoms is needed to understand plasma energy loss mechanisms. The Born approximation cross sections work for energies above 200 eV; the Gryziński model has been shown match experiment better below 40eV. Similarly, using exact analytic calculations for hydrogen atoms, the classical Gryzinski model works well at low energy but fails for higher energies. Numerous extensions of Gryziński's model have been applied to atom-electron impact ionization.

The fourth paper in 1965 replaced the empirical velocity distribution with a free fall model of the electron in the atom, based on classical mechanics. Gryziński's later work all focused on this model.

== Books ==
In 1996, Gryziński published a book titled True and false achievements of modern physics.

In 2002, Gryziński published a book-length description of his classical atomic theory along with related topics. Eryk Infeld pointed that Gryziński's book was a good read and that it had interesting observations of the state of the world, however, Infeld remarked the lack of mention of the successes of quantum theory and qualified Gryziński's remarks about the state of science and Poland as extremely pessimistic.

== Honor and awards ==
Gryziński received the Knight's Cross of Polonia Restituta and the first class Order of Merit of the Republic of Poland. Upon retirement he received the Soltan Medal from the Institute of Nuclear Studies.
