= Fuel Cells (journal) =

- Discipline: Engineering
- Language: English
- Edited by: Ulrich Stimming

Publication details
- History: 2001-present
- Publisher: Wiley-VCH
- Frequency: Bimonthly
- Impact factor: 2.8 (2022)

Standard abbreviations
- ISO 4: Fuel Cells

Indexing
- CODEN: FUCEFK
- ISSN: 1615-6854
- LCCN: 2002203901
- OCLC no.: 776194523

Links
- Journal homepage; Online access; Online archive

Fuel Cells—From Fundamentals to Systems is a bimonthly peer-reviewed scientific journal covering fundamental and applied research on fuel cell technology. Disciplines of interest are chemistry, materials science, physics, chemical engineering, electrical engineering, and mechanical engineering. Publishing formats include original research papers and reviews. It is published by Wiley-VCH and the editor-in-chief is Ulrich Stimming (TUM CREATE Center for Electromobility).

== Abstracting and indexing ==
The journal is abstracted and indexed by:

- Chemical Abstracts Service
- Chemistry Citation Index
- Compendex
- Current Contents/Physical, Chemical & Earth Sciences
- Inspec
- Science Citation Index Expanded
- Scopus
- FIZ Karlsruhe: ENERGY and TEMA
- VINITI

According to the Journal Citation Reports, the journal has a 2022 impact factor of 2.8.
