= Far-right Tracking Group =

South Korean activist group

- 극우 추적단
- Formation: January 2025
- Type: Civil society activism network
- Purpose: Monitor and report far-right YouTubers and online communities to platforms and authorities to disrupt revenue streams and curb hate speech
- Headquarters: Seoul, South Korea
- Region served: South Korea
- Leader: Anonymous (pseudonymous operator "A")
- Website: x.com/movek99"카운터스(극우 추적단) (@movek99)". X.

Far-right Tracking Group (Korean: 극우 추적단) is an informal activist network based in South Korea that emerged in early 2025 to monitor, document, and report far-right individuals and organizations, particularly YouTube channels, online chatrooms, and social media communities. Their primary tactics include filing abuse and misinformation reports with platforms such as YouTube and cooperating with legal authorities and civil society groups to suspend or demonetize extremist content.

== History ==
January 2025 - Started activities due to the 2024 martial law and Seoul Western Court riot

February 2025 - Full-scale activities begin through X account '@movek99'

March 2025 - About 100 people participate in KakaoTalk and Telegram open chat rooms

== Activities ==
- Monitoring: Volunteers track far-right YouTube channels, online forums, and open chatrooms to collect evidence of hate speech, disinformation, and incitement of violence.
- Reporting : Case files submitted to social media platforms, citing violations of terms of service, leading to demonetization or suspension of extremist channels.
- Public awareness: Publishing summaries of takedown actions and platform responses to mobilize public support and crowdfunding for operational costs.

== Impact ==
Since the activities of the far-right tracking group, some far-right YouTubers have stopped their accounts due to the loss of revenue, or have deleted extreme video content themselves out of fear of being reported. It is also said that positive changes have been detected in open chat rooms that are under surveillance, such as self-regulation of extreme expressions or hate speech. Media coverage in major outlets such as JTBC, NoCut News, and Kyunghyang Shinmun boosted their profile.

== See also ==
- New Right (South Korea)
