= ATLAS Forward Proton Project =

The ATLAS Forward Proton Project (AFP project) is a project at the ATLAS experiment at the Large Hadron Collider to detect protons in its forward area. It began with research and development in 2004 and was approved in 2015.

== History and goals ==
The initial FP420 R&D project was an international collaboration with members from 29 institutes from 10 countries, with aim of assessing the feasibility of installing proton tagging detectors at 420m from the interaction points of the ATLAS and CMS experiments. The main area of interest that motivated the project was the study proton-proton interactions and central exclusive production in the forward area of the machine. The particles involved travel down the forward area of the beam-pipe, where most of the energy emitted from collisions travels, but have smaller momenta than the original proton beams and have trajectories that diverge from it (because they are bent by different amounts by the collider magnets) and eventually hit the beam-pipe walls in places where they can be detected separately from the original beam. So this required installing new proton detectors at various distances along that beam-pipe. The existing ALFA proton detectors at ATLAS were only suitable for low-energy runs, whereas the new detectors were intended for high-energy collision measurements.

The research and development for the AFP project began in 2004. An initial letter of intent was submitted in 2009. The initial goal was to have two sets of proton detectors positioned in groups denoted "220" (at 216m and 224m distance) and "420" (at 416m and 424m), but the project was delayed in 2010 by the United Kingdom cutting funding, resulting in a decision to abandon the 420 detectors and only have the 220 ones. (The 420 detectors would in any case have presented greater technical difficulties over the 220 ones, as they would have involved also altering the liquid helium system already present at that location, and although necessary for Higgs boson studies they were not necessary for other studies.)

This reduced project went through a formal Technical Proposal stage, and was in 2012 approved by the ATLAS Collaboration Executive Board and endorsed by the LHC Experiments Committee. There were technical reviews in 2014, with the project getting ATLAS Upgrade approval in June of that year. An initial test beam that November demonstrated that the various systems were correctly integrated, and after a kick-off meeting on 2015-02-03 the ATLAS Executive Board confirmed its decision on 2015-02-30. At the time, installation of the detectors was aimed to be completed by 2017, for use in LHC Run 2.

The detectors at 216m are known as the "near" detectors, and the ones at 224m the "far" detectors, their separation being 15σ. They first began to collect data from LHC runs in 2016, but only in low-luminosity ones. From 2017 they were collecting data from all LHC runs.

== Equipment and experiments ==
The silicon tracking detectors (SiT) used in the project were modelled on the Insertable B-Layer (IBL) detector at ATLAS, using pixel measurements combined with magnet data to provide momentum spectrometry. In order to provide the ability to remove and re-insert the detectors they are mounted inside Roman pots. Each of the "far" detectors also includes a time-of-flight detector, designed to reduce "pile up" by measuring the differences in particle time-of-flight on both sides of the ATLAS interaction point and comparing it to the reconstructed position of the collision vertex. The time of flight detectors comprise a microchannel-plate photomultiplier (MCP-PMT) reading L-shaped quartz bars. Of particular concern is degradation caused by backscatter of positive ions, to combat which the photomultipliers are coated using atomic layer deposition. They are expected to withstand 3×10^{15} n_{eq}/cm^{2} per 100 fb^{−1}. Earlier designs for ToF called QUARTIC ("QUARtz TIming Cherenkov") were based on straight quartz bars. Originally, an alternative system named GASTOV was considered, which used a gas rather than quartz to generate the Cherenkov radiation recorded by the photomultiplier.

The silicon pixel sensors are positioned 2mm to 3mm from the beam. The construction of the pixel sensors is complicated by the uneven radiation doses that they receive over the course of their operating lifetimes. To harden them against this radiation their manufacture is more complex than that of a simple planar arrangement.

Their operating temperature also affects performance, and they are operated at a temperature of −20 °C with primary (Vortex Tube) and secondary (a vacuum kept between 5mbar and 30mbar) cooling systems. The vacuum system has a useful side-effect of reducing the mechanical stress caused by atmospheric pressure on the Roman pots, which have thin windows and floors.

Operating at 40 MHz an FE-I4B integrated circuit (IC) chip is DC coupled to the sensors themselves, providing multiple readout channels that can be independently amplified and shaped, and that have independently adjustable discriminator levels. The chip, running off an externally supplied clock, provides 4-bit timing data for the time-over-threshold which is stored alongside the firing time. The sensors themselves are 336×80 pixels, with each pixel being 50×250μm^{2} on their faces and 230μm deep.

This design is modelled off a 3-D sensor design that was made for the IBL by CNM (of Trento) and FBK (of Barcelona). An initial deficiency of the design was that it had a comparatively large (roughly 15000μm) dead area on the part of the sensor closest to the beam. This was ameliorated, reducing the dead area to approximately 200μm, by employing a cut by a diamond saw to "dice" the sensor. Tests were carried out in 2016 to determine the efficiency of this design; and the results showed an efficiency of 97%, potentially rising by 1% because the actual sensor arrangement could use a small incident angle whereas the testbed was placed perpendicular to the incident radiation. This angle is the mean Cherenkov angle, 14°, found to be the optimum angle giving a resolution of 6μm instead of the 50/√12μm that a perpendicular orientation gives.

There are several parts of the LHC that affect the refraction of the emitted protons, including the beam separation dipole magnets, the beam focusing quadrupole magnets, and the beam collimators that protect the magnets. The divergence of the detected protons from the main proton beam depends from the energy loss of the collision, and the AFP detectors by the nature of their positions can only detect protons with energy losses in the range from 2% to 10% of the energy of the original beam.

The resolutions of the time-of-flight detectors were measured in tests in 2015 to be between 38±6 ps and 46±5 ps per LQbar.

== Sources ==
- Adamczyk, L; Banaś, E; Brandt, A; et al. (2015-05-20). "Technical Design Report for the ATLAS Forward Proton Detector". CERN-LHCC-2015-009.
- Albrow, M. G.; Appleby, R. B.; Arneodo, M.; et al. (2009). "The FP420 R and D Project: Higgs and New Physics with forward protons at the LHC". Journal of Instrumentation. 4 (10) T10001. arXiv:0806.0302. Bibcode:2009JInst...4T0001A. doi:10.1088/1748-0221/4/10/T10001. S2CID 119200141.
- Staszewski, R. (April 2011). "The AFP project". Acta Physica Polonica B. 42 (7): 1615. arXiv:1104.1858. doi:10.5506/APhysPolB.42.1615. S2CID 118158814.
- Grinstein, S. (2016-04-01). "The ATLAS Forward Proton Detector (AFP)". Nuclear and Particle Physics Proceedings. 273–275: 1180–1184. Bibcode:2016NPPP..273.1180G. doi:10.1016/j.nuclphysbps.2015.09.185.
- Erland, P. A. (2019-02-06). "ATLAS Forward Proton Detectors Status and Plans". ATLAS Forward Proton detectors status and plans. The 27th International Workshop on Vertex Detectors, Chennai, India, 21 – 26 Oct 2018. pp. 7–16. doi:10.22323/1.348.0007. ATL-FWD-PROC-2019-001.
- "FP420 R&D Project". Archived from the original on 2009-07-27.
