= F. Dow Smith =

- Scientific career
- Fields: Physics

F. Dow Smith was president of the Optical Society of America in 1974.

== See also ==
- Optical Society of America § Past Presidents of the OSA
