= Fluidyne engine =

Alpha or gamma type Stirling engine with one or more liquid pistons

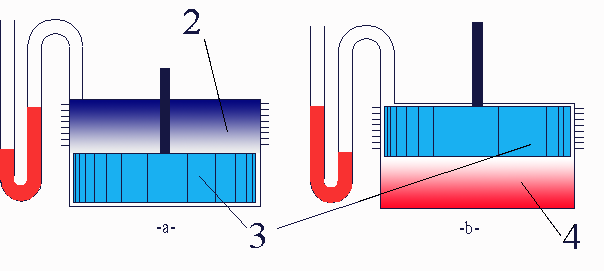
This is a Fluidyne variant with a solid displacer piston (3). In figure -a-, as the displacer moves from the cold compression space (2), to the hot expansion space (4) in figure -b-, the temperature of the gaseous working fluid is increased. This increases the pressure of the gaseous working fluid, and as it expands, work is done on the (red) liquid piston as it is pushed through the tube.

schematic of a U-tube type Fluidyne engine.

A concentric-cylinder Fluidyne pumping engine. Topologically equivalent to a U-tube design.

A Fluidyne engine is an alpha or gamma type Stirling engine with one or more liquid pistons. It contains a working gas (often air), and either two liquid pistons or one liquid piston and a displacer.

The engine was invented in 1969. The engine was patented in 1973 by the United Kingdom Atomic Energy Authority.

== Engine operation ==
Working gas in the engine is heated, and this causes it to expand and push on the water column. This expansion cools the air which contracts, at the same time being pushed back by the weight of the displaced water column. The cycle then repeats.

The U-tube version has no moving parts in the engine other than the water and air, although there are two check valves in the pump. This engine operates at a natural resonance cycle that is "tuned" by adjusting the geometry, generally with a "tuning tube" of water.

== Engine as a pump ==
In the classic configuration, the work produced via the water pistons is integrated with a water pump. The simple pump is external to the engine, and consists of two check valves, one on the intake and one on the outlet. In the engine, the loop of oscillating liquid can be thought of as acting as a displacer piston. The liquid in the single tube extending to the pump acts as the power piston. Traditionally the pump is open to the atmosphere, and the hydraulic head is small, so that the absolute engine pressure is close to atmospheric pressure.

== Demonstration video ==
Test of a model Fluidyne engine.

Detail of a water level displacement in a leftmost vertical tube.

The videos show operation of a U-tube type model Fluidyne engine. Hot pipe is heated by a heat gun, and water column oscillation builds up to a steady-state level. Second video shows a detail of the actual water displacement.

== See also ==
- Humphrey pump
