= Fermi point =

Concept in quantum field theory and nanotechnology

The term Fermi point has two applications but refers to the same phenomena (special relativity):

- Fermi point (quantum field theory)
- Fermi point (nanotechnology)

For both applications count that the symmetry between particles and anti-particles in weak interactions is violated:
At this point the particle energy E = cp is zero.
In nanotechnology this concept can be applied to electron behavior. An electron as a single particle is a fermion obeying the Pauli exclusion principle.

== Fermi point (quantum field theory) ==
Fermionic systems that have a Fermi surface (FS) belong to a universality class in quantum field theory. Any collection of fermions with weak repulsive interactions belongs to this class. At the Fermi point, the break of symmetry can be explained by assuming a vortex or singularity will appear as a result of the spin of a fermi particle (quasiparticle, fermion) in one dimension of the three-dimensional momentum space.

== Fermi point (nanoscience) ==
A semiconductor bandgap structure. At the Fermi point, the bandgap of a carbon nanotube effectively disappears.

The Fermi point is one particular electron state. The Fermi point refers to an event chirality of electrons is involved and the diameter of a carbon nanotube for which the nanotube becomes metallic. As the structure of a carbon nanotube determines the energy levels that the carbon's electrons may occupy, the structure affects macroscopic properties of the nanotube structure, most notably electrical and thermal conductivity.

Flat graphite is a conductor except when rolled up into small cylinders. This circular structure inhibits the internal flow of electrons and the graphite becomes a semiconductor; a transition point forms between the valence band and conduction band. This point is called the Fermi point. If the diameter of the carbon nanotube is sufficiently great, the necessary transition phase disappears and the nanotube may be considered a conductor.

== See also ==
- Fermi energy
- Fermi surface
- Bandgap
