= Naoshi Fukushima =

Japanese physicist

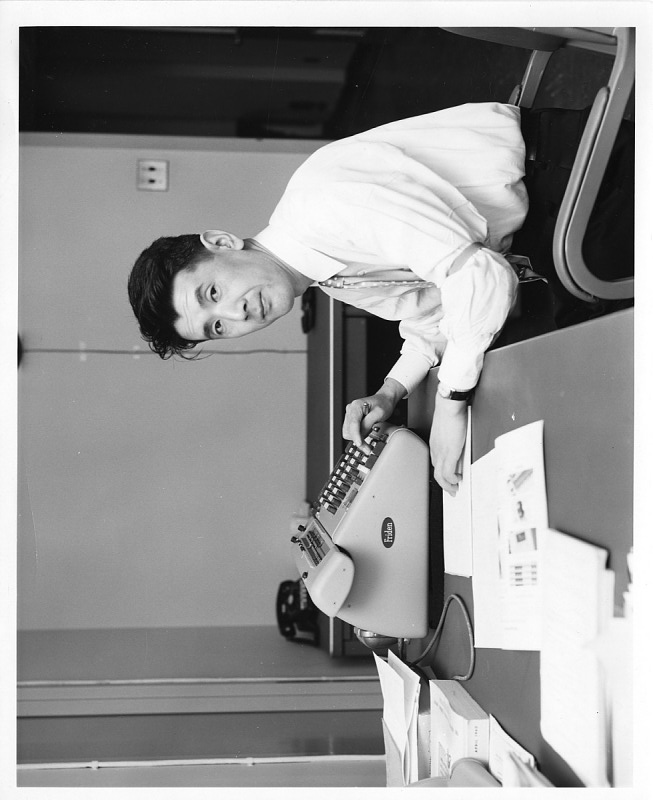
Naoshi Fukushima (1925-2003), physicist, who was a visiting fellow at the Goddard Space Center when photograph was taken.

Naoshi Fukushima (福島 直, Fukushima Naoshi, January 19, 1925 – June 25, 2003) was a Japanese physicist specializing in the near-Earth space environment. He served as Secretary General of the International Association of Geomagnetism and Aeronomy from 1975 to 1983. In 1990 he was awarded the AGU's Waldo E. Smith Award.

He is best known for proving that, under certain conditions, the magnetic field from a field-aligned current and the magnetic field from the associated Pederson current in the ionosphere would exactly cancel at the surface of the Earth. The magnetic equivalence of field-aligned currents with Pederson currents is referred to colloquially as Fukushima's Theorem.
