= Women Against Private Police =

Baltimore, Maryland, US based organization

Women Against Private Police (WAPP)
- Founded: April 3, 2019
- Founder: Jillian Aldebron
- Purpose: Opposition to private police at Johns Hopkins University
- Location: Baltimore, Maryland
- Website: https://noprivatepolice.org/

Women Against Private Police (WAPP) was an organization based in Baltimore, Maryland, that focused on opposing the creation of a private police force at Johns Hopkins University.

== History ==
Women Against Private Police was founded on April 3, 2019. The organization was started by a group of women who live near the Johns Hopkins campuses in Baltimore. The group formed after the Maryland General Assembly passed a bill allowing Johns Hopkins to own and operate an armed police force with full police powers under Maryland law that has jurisdiction over Baltimore campuses and private residential neighborhoods in the vicinity of Hopkins properties. WAPP was a ballot issue committee registered for the purpose of launching a petition drive. If the petition drive had been successful, voters in 2020 would have been given a choice to decide whether or not a private corporation should be allowed to operate a police force with jurisdiction over public streets. WAPP would have had to gather nearly 70,000 signatures in just over 2 months in order to place the issue on the November 2020 ballot.

The State Board of Elections issued an advanced determination that the issue could not be brought to a referendum vote because it contains spending measures, an exemption to the referendum provision under the state constitution. WAPP contested this opinion and filed suit in Anne Arundel County Circuit Court. The ACLU and the Public Justice Center represented WAPP in this matter. The Court dismissed the suit on grounds that it was not ripe, permitting WAPP to refile its lawsuit if it could achieve the requisite number of petition signatures by May 31.
