= Fukushima's Theorem =

In physics, Fukushima's Theorem holds that for all points beneath the ionosphere the magnetic fields from field-aligned currents and their corresponding Pedersen currents exactly cancel. By superposition the total magnetic field at the ground is then equal to the magnetic field from just the ionospheric Hall currents.

Fukushima's Theorem holds in any planar or spherical geometry, provided that the field-aligned currents are perpendicular to the ground, and that the ionospheric conductance is spatially constant. Neither of these conditions holds strongly in the auroral region of the Earth's ionosphere.

Illustration of cancellation of ground magnetic fields by Fukushima's Theorem.

== Journal articles ==
- Fukushima, Naoshi (1969). "Equivalence in ground geomagnetic effect of Chapman-Vestine's and Birkeland-Alfven's current systems for polar magnetic storms". Rep. Ionosphere Space Res. Jap. 23: 219–27.
- Naoshi Fukushima, "Generalized theorem for no ground magnetic effect of vertical currents connected with Pedersen currents in the uniform-conductivity ionosphere", Rep. Ionos.Space Res.Jap 30, 35-50 (1976).
- Fukushima, N. (1994). "Some topics and historical episodes in geomagnetism and aeronomy". Journal of Geophysical Research. 99 (A10). American Geophysical Union (AGU): 19113. doi:10.1029/94ja00102. ISSN 0148-0227.
