= FluoroPOSS =

FluoroPOSS (Fluorinated Polyhedral Oligomeric Silsesquioxanes) is a synthetic microfiber with very low surface energy, which makes it oil-repellent. Mixed with an ordinary polymer, it forms a material which can be applied to other materials such as metal, glass, plastic, plant fibers or leaves. The application process is called electrospinning.

FluoroPOSS has been developed at the Massachusetts Institute of Technology (MIT).

== See also ==
- Wetting
