= Freeze thaw resistance =

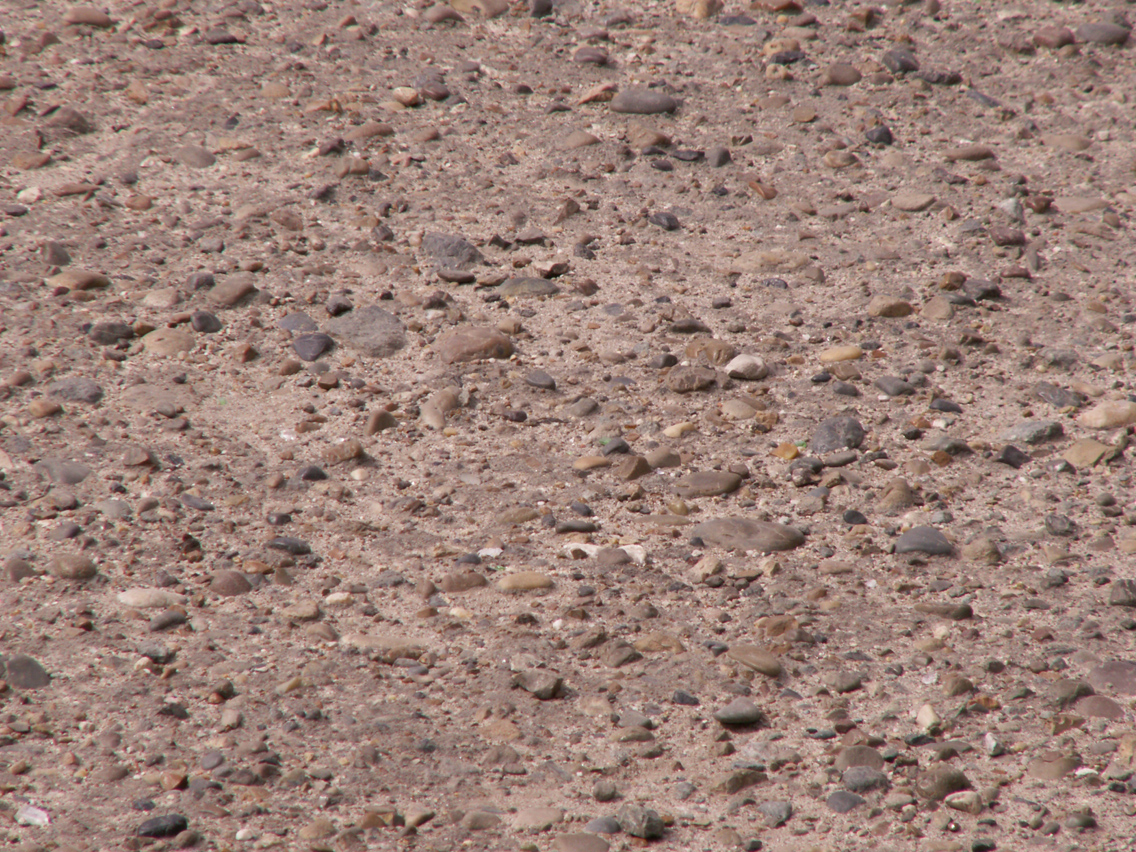
Low frost resistance resulting in destruction of asphalt pavement after 5 years of operation

Freeze thaw resistance, or freezing and thawing resistance, is the property of solids to resist cyclic freezing and melting.

== See also ==
- Frost weathering
