= FTG (band) =

- Origin: Perak, Malaysia
- Genres: Thrash metal
- Occupation: Vocal / musicians
- Years active: 1989–present
- Labels: FGM Productions; VSP Records; Pony Canyon; Interglobal Music
- Members: Tajul; Mohd Isa Mohd Rafli; Mohd Nizam Mohd Shariff
- Past members: Ibat Karim; Azmie Ibrahim
- Website: myspace.com/jacftgo

FTG (Freedom That's Gone) is a thrash metal band from Malaysia. They are among the earliest to appear at the end of the era of the first generation of underground music Malaysia such as Nemesis, Punisher and others.

== History ==
FTG was originally a group of musicians who worked as a studio sessionist in FGM (Family Group Malaysia) which was formerly managed by pop artists such as Zaiton Sameon and Eddie Hamid.

EP were recording their first overtones "Thrash Metal" Malaysia is the first released to the market. IT releasing by FGM since 1992. A few weeks later a record company called VSP also produced a Cromok demo-EP, titled "Image of Purity" (a record in Wollongong, Sydney, Australia). Both recordings became the starting point for the rise of thrash metal in the Malaysian music industry.

FTG Group to highlight the image of Thrash metal and its popularity nationwide. Lately they prefer taking a different route of music but still maintain aggressive less reluctant metal music itself. They also tend to produce the album in Malay language, and no longer use the English language.

After the album "To The Front", vocalist Bart left the band and was replaced by Tajul. Although some criticize the inclusion of the new vocalist, they produced an album with the new vocalist Tajul titled "Aku Tak Peduli" and not until a week the criticized album reached sales of 50 thousand units, and also a platinum award.

At the end of 2006, the original bass player, Mie (also known as Mie FTG) started playing bass for a reggae band, Pure Vibracion. In 2008, Hashim from Sil Khannaz replaced him as the bass player templates sessionist.

== Members ==
Current line-up

- Tajul – vocal
- Mohd Isa Mohd Rafli (Jac) – guitar
- Allahyarham Mohd Nizam Mohd Shariff (Zam) – drum
- Hashim Pestilence – bass (Sil Khannaz, Brain Dead, Damien, The Pilgrims)

Former line-up

- Allahyarham Ibat Karim (Bart)- vocal
- Azmie Ibrahim – bass (Pure Vibracion)

== Discography ==
=== EPs ===
- Freedom That's Gone

(1991) rr

=== Studio album ===
- After The Promise (1992)
- Spirit To Rebel (1994)
- To The Front (1996)
- Aku Tak Peduli (1998)
- Made in Malaysia (1999)
- FTG (2000)
- Made in Malaysia Vol.2 (2001)
- Reborn (2002)
- Stop This Madness (2004)
- Kuasa (2006)
- Kau Jangan Kurang Ajar (2019)

=== Live album ===
- Live at Metal Wars (1999)

=== Compilation album ===
- Stronger Than Steel – The Best Of FTG (1998)
- Cromok & FTG (2000)
- Kompilasi Terbaik FTG & Sil Khannaz (2001)
- FTG rage D' Cromok (2006)
