= Fission Product Pilot Plant =

Coordinates: 35.92646292°N 84.31681642°W

The Fission Product Pilot Plant, building 3515 at Oak Ridge National Laboratory (ORNL), was built in 1948 to extract radioactive isotopes from liquid radioactive waste. It was formerly known as the 'ruthenium-106 tank arrangement'. It was a relatively small facility; the task of extracting radioactive isotopes later took place at a number of specialised buildings nearby.

References differ as to when the plant was built; 'radioactive waste management at ORNL' says that it was completed in 1957, the 1955 Annual Report has engineering drawings indicating that the building was fully designed in 1955, but other references suggest that there was a building on the site in 1948.

== Contamination issues ==
The plant was extensively contaminated during operation, particularly by waste produced while flushing out the tanks inside for maintenance. Traces of human feces were found in the tanks.

== End of life ==
Operations at FPPP ended in the early 1960s, and the plant was entombed in concrete up to 1.5 metres (4.9 ft) thick; there was a proposal made in 1993 for dismantling the plant by robot from the inside, but it's not clear whether this was carried out.
