= Anisotropy energy =

Anisotropic energy is energy that is directionally specific. The word anisotropy means "directionally dependent", hence the definition. The most common form of anisotropic energy is magnetocrystalline anisotropy, which is commonly studied in ferromagnets. In ferromagnets, there are islands or domains of atoms that are all coordinated in a certain direction; this spontaneous positioning is often called the "easy" direction, indicating that this is the lowest energy state for these atoms. In order to study magnetocrystalline anisotropy, energy (usually in the form of an electric current) is applied to the domain, which causes the crystals to deflect from the "easy" to "hard" positions. The energy required to do this is defined as the anisotropic energy. The easy and hard alignments and their relative energies are due to the interaction between spin magnetic moment of each atom and the crystal lattice of the compound being studied.

== See also ==
- Magnetic anisotropy
