= Fleming's right-hand rule =

Mnemonic for the direction of induced current in a moving magnetic field

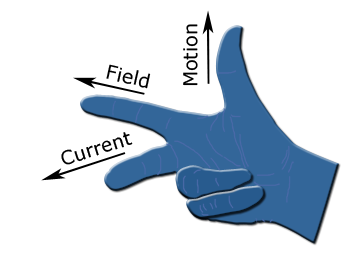
Fleming's right hand rule

In electromagnetism, Fleming's right-hand rule (for generators) shows the direction of induced current when a conductor attached to a circuit moves in a magnetic field. It can be used to determine the direction of current in a generator's windings.

When a conductor such as a wire attached to a circuit moves through a magnetic field, an electric current is induced in the wire due to Faraday's law of induction. The current in the wire can have two possible directions. Fleming's right-hand rule gives which direction the current flows.

The right hand is held with the thumb, index finger and middle finger mutually perpendicular to each other (at right angles), as shown in the diagram.

- The thu**m**b is pointed in the direction of the **m**otion of the conductor relative to the magnetic field.
- The **f**irst finger is pointed in the direction of the magnetic **f**ield. By convention, it's the direction from North to South magnetic pole.
- Then the se**c**ond finger represents the direction of the induced or generated **c**urrent within the conductor (from + to −, the terminal with lower electric potential to the terminal with higher electric potential, as in a voltage source)

The bolded letters in the directions above give a mnemonic way to remember the order. Another mnemonic for remembering the rule is the initialism "FBI", standing for Force (or otherwise motion), B the symbol for the magnetic field, and I the symbol for current. The subsequent letters correspond to subsequent fingers, counting from the top: thumb → F; first finger → B; second finger → I.

There is also a Fleming's left-hand rule (for electric motors). The appropriately handed rule can be recalled from the letter "g", which is in "right" and "generator".

These mnemonics are named after British engineer John Ambrose Fleming, who invented them.

An equivalent version of Fleming's right-hand rule is the left-hand palm rule.

== Distinction between the right-hand and left-hand rule ==
Fleming's left-hand rule is used for electric motors, while Fleming's right-hand rule is used for electric generators. In other words, Fleming's left hand rule should be used if one were to create motion, while Fleming's right hand rule should be used if one were to create electricity.

Different hands need to be used for motors and generators because of the differences between cause and effect.

In an electric motor, the electric current and magnetic field exist (which are the causes), and they lead to the force that creates the motion (which is the effect), and so the left-hand rule is used. In an electric generator, the motion and magnetic field exist (causes), and they lead to the creation of the electric current (effect), and so the right-hand rule is used.

To illustrate why, consider that many types of electric motors can also be used as electric generators. A vehicle powered by such a motor can be accelerated up to high speed by connecting the motor to a fully charged battery. If the motor is then disconnected from the fully charged battery, and connected instead to a completely flat battery, the vehicle will decelerate. The motor will act as a generator and convert the vehicle's kinetic energy back to electrical energy, which is then stored in the battery. Since neither the direction of motion nor the direction of the magnetic field (inside the motor/generator) has changed, the direction of the electric current in the motor/generator has reversed. This follows from the second law of thermodynamics (the generator current must oppose the motor current, and the stronger current outweighs the other to allow the energy to flow from the more energetic source to the less energetic source).

== See also ==
- Right-hand rule
- Fleming's left-hand rule for motors
