= For all practical purposes =

For all practical purposes (sometimes abbreviated FAPP) is a slogan used in physics to express a pragmatic attitude. A physical theory might be ambiguous in some ways — for example, being founded on untested assumptions or making unclear predictions about what might happen in certain situations — and yet still be successful in practice. Such a theory is said to be successful FAPP.

FAPP is also emerging as a valuable concept and approach in mathematics with a major title by the name "For All Practical Purposes: Mathematical Literacy in Today's World".

There is also a profound joke about FAPP:

An elementary physics professor was teaching about how close you could get to the sun. He laid the foundation of heat and distance, and said that is as close as you can get FAPP. A boy asked, "what does that mean?"

The professor replied "All the girls in the room line up on the right side, and all of the boys line up on the left side. Now halve the distance between each side. Now do it again. After about five times of doing this, as their noses were touching, He said: "You are all close enough for all practical purposes".

== See also ==
- Hand waving
- Philosophy of science
- Metaphysics
- Limit (mathematics)
- Phenomenalism
- Empiricism
