= Fluid dynamic gauge =

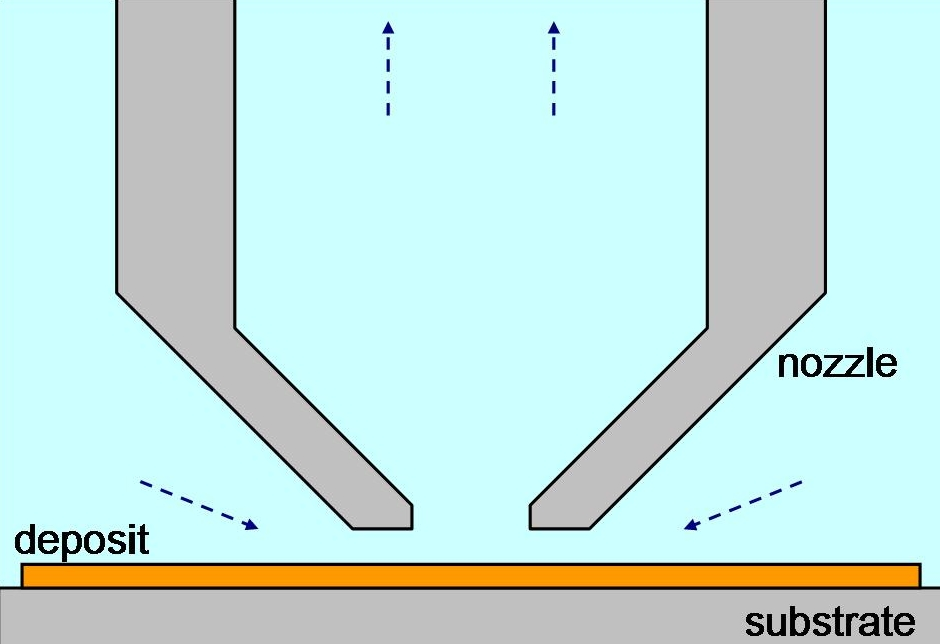
Operating principles of FDG. The separation between nozzle and deposit is measured by monitoring the liquid flowrate into the nozzle

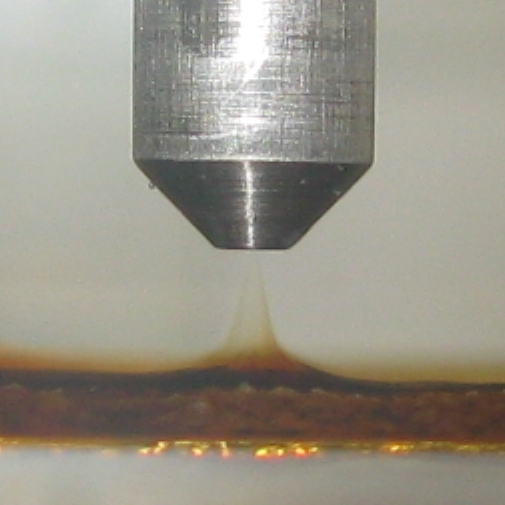
Fluid dynamic gauging of a soft deposit layer (tomato paste)

A fluid dynamic gauge (FDG) is a measurement technique used to study the behaviour of soft deposit layers in a liquid environment. It employs fluid mechanics to determine the thickness of the layer, and can also be used to obtain a measure of its strength. It was inspired by the technique of pneumatic gauging, which relies on a flow of air rather than the process liquid. Fluid dynamic gauging can be conducted as an in-line measuring technique, but is more commonly used as a research tool.

The technique was originally developed to measure the buildup or removal of the fouling layers commonly encountered in the process industry (such as in the heat treatment of dairy products). More recently, it has been applied to study cake buildup on porous membrane surfaces. Scanning versions can determine the topology of a solid/soft-solid surface immersed in a liquid environment, in an analogous manner to an atomic force microscope, but exploiting the principles of fluid mechanics.

Key features of the technique are that it can study soft deposit layers without touching them, relies on relatively simple operating principles, can be used in a completely opaque liquid, and does not rely on knowledge of the fluid or deposit properties.
