= Fyodor Fyodorov =

Fyodor Fyodorov or Fedor Fedorov (Фёдор Фёдоров) may refer to:

- Fedor Fedorov (ice hockey) (born 1981), Russian ice hockey player
- Fyodor Fyodorov (physicist), Soviet-Belarusian physicist
