= Richard Mott =

Richard Mott may refer to:

- Richard Mott (politician)
- Richard Mott (statistician)
