= Imbert–Fedorov effect =

Optical phenomenon

The Imbert–Fedorov effect, named after Fyodor Fyodorov (1911–1994) and Christian Imbert (1937–1998), is an optical phenomenon whereby a beam of circularly or elliptically polarized light undergoes a small sideways shift when refracted or totally internally reflected. The sideways shift is perpendicular to the plane containing the incident and reflected beams. This effect is the circular polarization analog of the Goos–Hänchen effect.
