= Richard Mott (statistician) =

Richard Mott is Weldon Professor of Computational and Statistical Genetics in the research department of Genetics, Evolution and Environment at University College London. He was previously at the Wellcome Centre for Human Genetics and a Professor by Research at Oxford University.

He has worked on physical mapping with Hans Lehrach at Imperial Cancer Research Fund laboratories in London, where he developed a suite of software tools for the construction and validation of physical maps In 1995 he moved to the Sanger Centre to work on DNA sequence assembly where he wrote software that automatically analysed sequencing trace data in order to edit DNA sequence assemblies. This was used extensively to accelerate sequence production. He wrote the sequence CAFtools assembly pipeline which was used for the pipeline assembly of the human and other genomes at Sanger, and developed software for spliced alignment of EST to genomic DNA.

Between 1999 and 2015 he worked at the Wellcome Trust Centre for Human Genetics where he served as Head of Bioinformatics and Statistical Genetics. In 2010 he stepped down to concentrate on his own research leading a group working on quantitative genetics in plants and mice. He moved to UCL in November 2015.

He has developed methods for mapping in an outbred stock of mice (the heterogeneous stock). He developed the HAPPY software package used for high-resolution QTL mapping which led to the identification of a quantitative trait gene underlying behavioral variation in mice. As part of an international collaboration he is developing a genetic reference panel of recombinant inbred lines of mice, known as the Collaborative Cross. With Dr Paula Kover, Bath University, he has developed a genetic reference panel in Arabidopsis thaliana
