= Wellcome Centre for Human Genetics =

Research Institute at the University of Oxford

Centre for Human Genetics
- Parent institution: University of Oxford; Wellcome Trust
- Established: 1994; 32 years ago
- Director: Holm Uhlig
- Staff: 470
- Key people: Yvonne Jones (deputy director)
- Formerly called: Wellcome Trust Center for Human Genetics
- Location: Henry Wellcome Building of Genomic Medicine, Oxford
- Coordinates: 51.752248°N 1.215255°W
- Interactive map of Centre for Human Genetics
- Website: www.chg.ox.ac.uk

The Centre for Human Genetics (CHG) is a human genetics research centre of the Nuffield Department of Medicine at the Medical Sciences Division at the University of Oxford in England. It is funded by the Wellcome Trust among others.

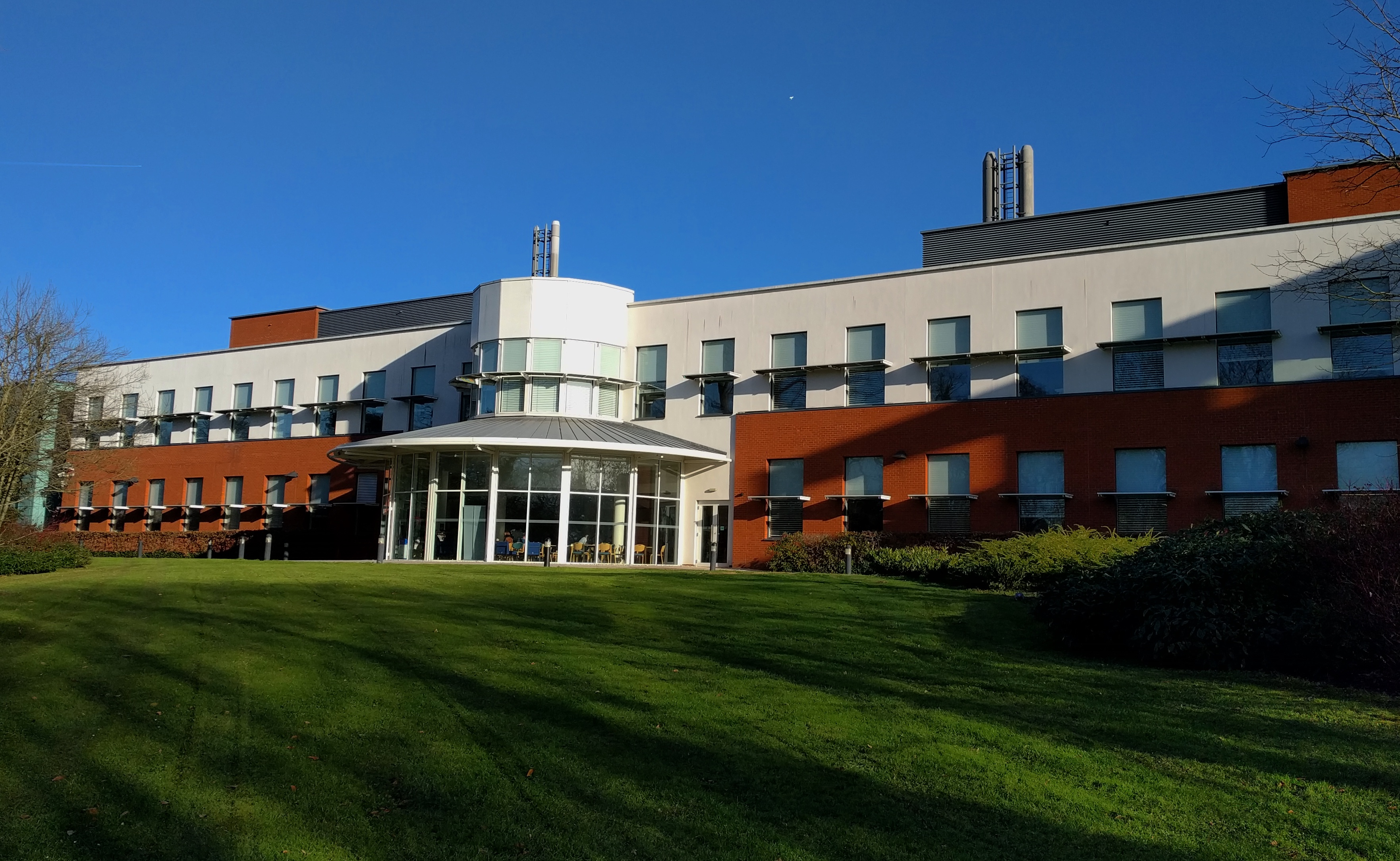
Henry Wellcome Building for Genomic Medicine

== Facilities & resources ==
The centre is located at the Henry Wellcome Building of Genomic Medicine, which cost £20 million and was officially opened in June 2000 with Anthony Monaco as the director.

Within the CHG a number of 'cores' provide services to the researchers:

=== Oxford Genomics Centre ===
The Oxford Genomics Centre provides high throughput sequencing (HTS) services, using Illumina HiSeq4000 2500 and NextSeq500 and MiSeq. They also offer Oxford Nanopore MinION and PromethION sequencing. There are also Array platforms for genotyping, gene expression, and methylation including Illuminia Infinium, Affymetrix and Fluidigm.

=== Research Computing Core ===
The Research Computing Core provides access to computer resources including 4120 cores and 4.2 PB of storage.

=== Transgenics ===
The Transgenics Core provides access to genetically modified mice and cell lines.

=== Cellular Imaging ===
Cellular Imaging Core provides microscopy facilities including fluorescence microscopy (including Fluorescence Correlation Spectroscopy (FCS), Fluorescence Lifetime Correlation Spectroscopy (FLCS), Fluorescence Lifetime Imaging Microscopy (FLIM), Total Internal Reflection Fluorescence Microscopy (TIRF), Photoactivated Localisation Microscopy (PALM), Spectral Imaging (SI) and Single Particle Tracking (SPT).

== Research ==
=== Statistical and population genetics ===
The CHG has been involved in many international statistical genetics advances including the Wellcome Trust Case Control Consortia (WTCCC, WTCCC2), the 1000 Genomes Project and the International HapMap Project.
