= Snell's window =

Underwater phenomenon due to Snell's Law

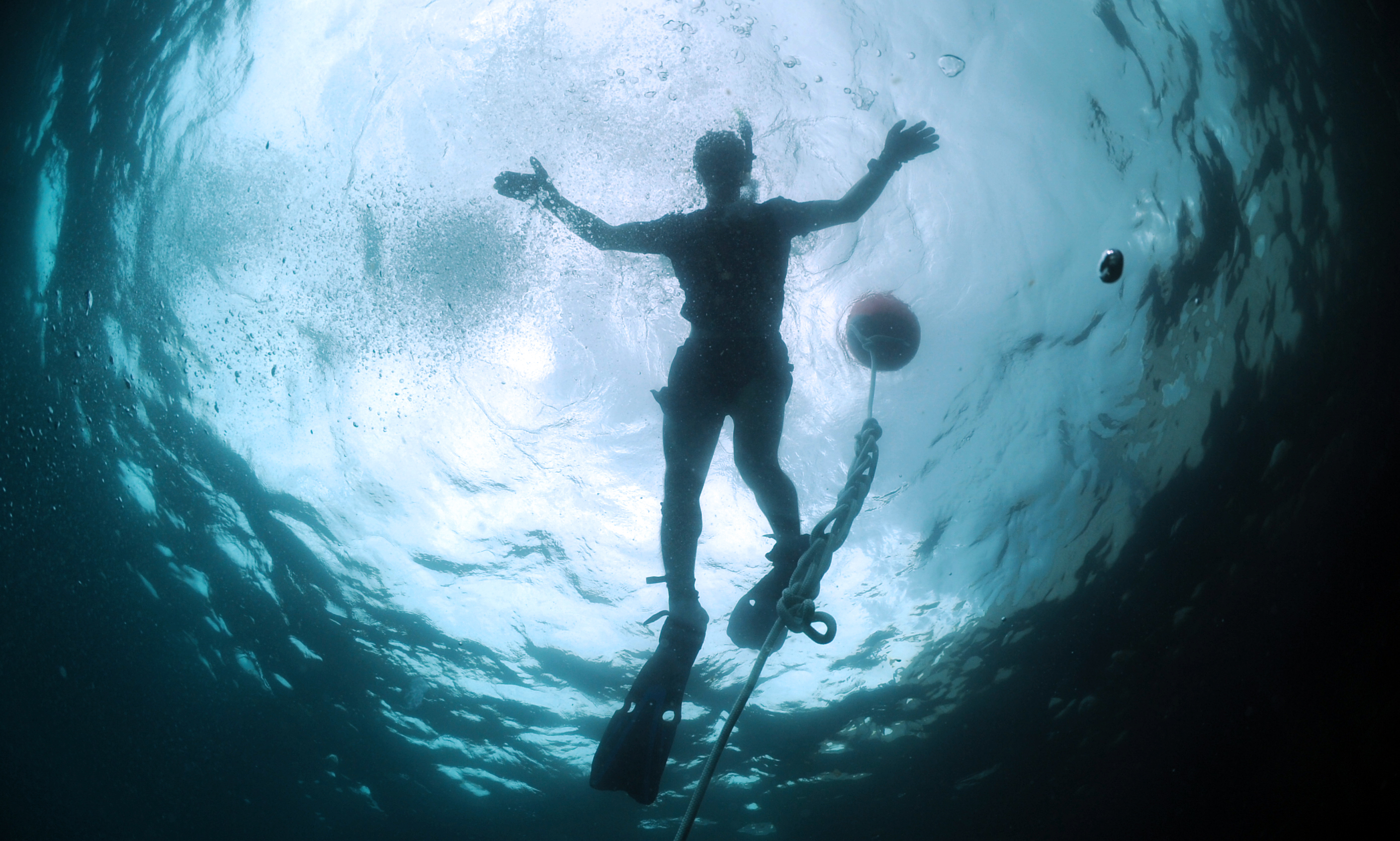
A diver viewed from below who appears inside of Snell's window.

Snell's window (also called Snell's circle or optical man-hole) is a phenomenon by which an underwater viewer sees everything above the surface through a cone of light of width of about 96 degrees. This phenomenon is caused by refraction of light entering water, and is governed by Snell's Law. The area outside Snell's window will either be completely dark or show a reflection of underwater objects by total internal reflection.

Underwater photographers sometimes compose photographs from below such that their subjects fall inside Snell's window, which backlights and focuses attention on the subjects.

== Image formation ==

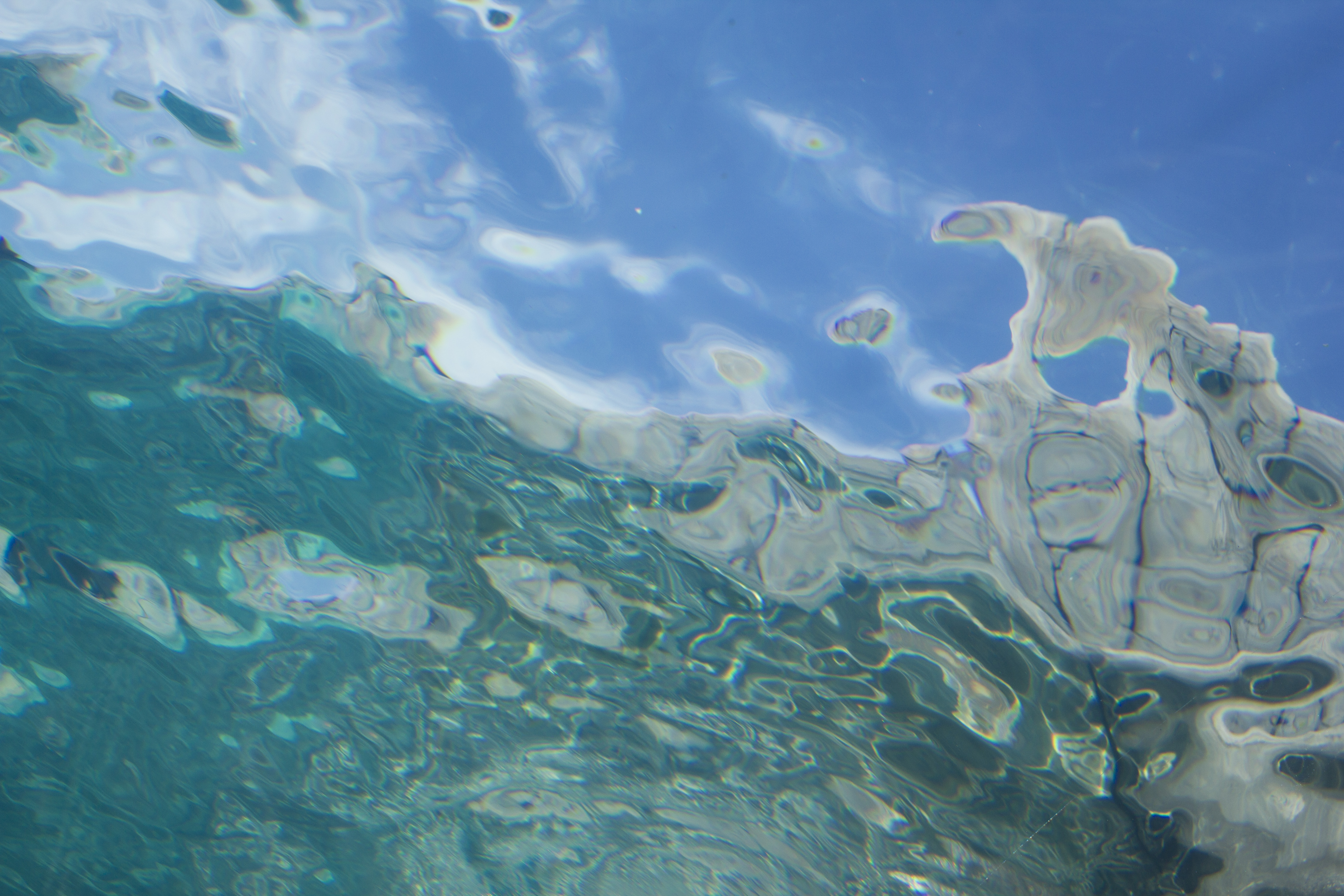
The edge of Snell's window, in this case the boundary between reflected bottom (teal) and refracted sky and above-water structures (blue and gray)

Under ideal conditions, an observer looking up at the water surface from underneath sees a perfectly circular image of the entire above-water hemisphere—from horizon to horizon. Due to refraction at the air/water boundary, Snell's window compresses a 180° angle of view above water to a 97° angle of view below water, similar to the effect of a fisheye lens. The brightness of this image falls off to nothing at the circumference/horizon because more of the incident light at low grazing angles is reflected rather than refracted (see Fresnel equations). Refraction is very sensitive to any irregularities in the flatness of the surface (such as ripples or waves), which will cause local distortions or complete disintegration of the image. Turbidity in the water will veil the image behind a cloud of scattered light.
