= Yanka Maur =

Belarusian writer

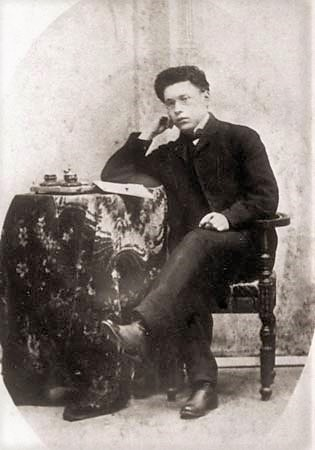
Janka Maŭr

Janka Maŭr (Belarusian: Я́нка Маўр; Latvian: Janka Maurs; Russian: Я́нка Мавр; Yanka Mavr; 11 May 1883 – 3 August 1971) was a Soviet and Belarusian writer, translator and playwright. Janka Maŭr was actually his pseudonym as his true name was Ivan Michajłavič Fiodaraŭ (Belarusian: Іва́н Міха́йлавіч Фёдараў). His son, Fiodar Fiodaraŭ, was a famous Belarusian physicist.

He was born in Liepāja, Courland, Latvia but was raised in the Belarusian village of Lebianiški (now Lithuania). He graduated from vocational school in Kaunas, then entered a pedagogical school in 1899, but was thrown out for being a member of an underground revolutionary club. Nevertheless, in 1903 he passed all the exams as a non-resident student and became a high school teacher. In 1906 took part in the underground meeting of the Belarusian teachers, organized by the famous Belarusian writer Yakub Kolas.

After his arrest, he could not work as a teacher anymore. He could teach again only in 1911, becoming a geography and history teacher in a private school in Minsk. He worked in different literary genres: satirical, historical, children, etc. His best-known novel is Amok, but his best-selling and perhaps most known book was Polesia Robinsons. Besides writing, he also translated stories into Belarusian from many foreign authors, including Jules Verne, Victor Hugo, Anton Chekhov, and Mark Twain, among others.

== Books ==
- The Man Is Coming (Чалавек ідзе) 1924
- In the Country of the Paradise Bird (У краіне райскай птушкі) 1926
- The Son of Water (Сын вады) 1927
- Amok (Амок) 1928
- The Trip to Hell (Падарожжа ў пекла) 1928
- Polesia Robinsons (Палескія Рабінзоны) 1929
- The Story of the Future Days (Аповесьць будучых дзён) 1932
- Around the World (Вакол свету) 1947
- TVT (ТВТ) 1934, 1949
- Away from the Darkness 1920, 1956–1958
- FantamobilofProfessor Cyliakouski (Фантамабіль прафесара Цылякоўскага) 1955
