= Fyodor Fyodorov (physicist) =

Soviet-Belarusian physicist

Fyodor Ivanovich Fyodorov, also known as Fedor Fedorov (Russian: Фёдор Иванович Фёдоров, Belarusian: Фёдар Іванавіч Фёдараў, Fiodar Ivanavič Fiodaraŭ, June 19, 1911–October 13, 1994, was a Soviet and Belarusian physicist whose scientific interests ranged from optics and spectroscopy to the theory of elementary particles.

== Biography ==
He was born in the village of Turets in Karelichy Raion, Hrodna Voblast, Belarus, to a family of rural schoolteachers, but his father, Ivan Mikhailovich Fyodorov, later became a famous Belarusian writer known under the pen name Yanka Maur.

During the Second World War, Fiodaraŭ worked in the city of Kiselevsk in Novosibirsk Region as an associate professor of Moscow Aviation Institute. In 1943 he became the dean of the Physics Faculty of the Belarusian State University which had resumed its work near the Skhodnya railroad station outside Moscow while Belarus was still under occupation. He was in office until 1950.

He took an active part in the organization of the Institute of Physics and Mathematics of the Belarus Science Academy and was the leader of one of the four major laboratories there (the laboratory of theoretical physics) until 1987.

Until the end of his life Fyodorov was a professor at the Belarusian State University. He published over 400 research articles.

== See also ==
- Imbert–Fedorov effect
