= Mathias Schubert =

German physicist

Mathias M. Schubert
- Born: October 19, 1966 (age 60); Jena, East Germany
- Education: University of Leipzig
- Scientific career
- Workplaces: University of Leipzig; University of Nebraska–Lincoln

Mathias Michael Schubert (born 19 October 1966) is a German-born U.S. American physicist, J. A. Woollam Distinguished Professor of Electrical and Computer Engineering at the University of Nebraska–Lincoln, and member of the Nebraska Center for Materials and Nanoscience. He is a specialist in spectroscopic ellipsometry and has contributed to the development of blue and white LED, fast processors and efficient biological and chemical sensors. He is also WISE invited professor with support by the Knut and Alice Wallenberg Foundation as visiting guest professor at the department of Solid State Physics in Lund University and C3NiT: Centre for III nitride technology since 2025. Schubert serves as Associate Editor for the journal Applied Physics Letters since 2017.

== Early life and education ==
Schubert was born in Jena, Bezirk Gera, East Germany. He graduated high school in 1986 with vocational education as tool and die maker from the Keramische Werke in Hermsdorf. After military service he studied physics at the University of Leipzig until 1994. He received a fellowship from the German Merit Foundation in 1995 for his doctoral research. In 1997 after earning his PhD he moved to the University of Nebraska–Lincoln, where he worked on infrared ellipsometry developments for characterization of semiconductors. After return to the University of Leipzig he obtained his habilitation in 2003 in experimental physics.

== Research and career ==
In 2000, Schubert was appointed Assistant Professor (Habilitant, C1) at University of Leipzig, where he founded the Ellipsometry group. In 2005 Schubert was founding member of the German Association of Ellipsometry (Paul Drude e.V.). In 2005 Schubert was appointed associate professor at the University of Nebraska–Lincoln, where he founded the Complex Materials Optics Network. In 2012 he became Full professor. Schubert's research focuses on broad spectral range optical characterization of organic and inorganic materials. He invented and developed spectroscopic generalized ellipsometry broadly for characterization of arbitrarily anisotropic materials. His research team invented the optical Hall effect for noncontact measurement of the charge carrier effective mass in semiconductor materials and thin film heterojunctions. The generalized ellipsometry concept permits analysis of optical properties of materials with all members of the Crystallographic point group, particularly with low symmetry such as Orthorhombic crystal system, Monoclinic crystal system, and Triclinic crystal system. Schubert developed a general concept for modeling the optical properties of low-symmetry materials, the eigendielectric polarization model. In 2022, he demonstrated measurement of the magnetic susceptibility tensor in electron paramagnetic resonance using terahertz ellipsometry and was part of a team describing a new form of coupled phonon photon states in low-symmetry materials. In 2025 Schubert and his team revealed a magnetic form of the Lyddane–Sachs–Teller relation as a new fundamental law in solid state physics.

== Awards and honors ==
- 1995 Fellowship of the German Merit Foundation (Studienstiftung des Deutschen Volkes)
- 2002 Fellowship of the Swedish Foundation for International Cooperation in Research and Higher Education (STINT)
- 2006 Ludwig-Genzel Prize
- 2011 Elected Fellow of the American Physical Society
- 2014 Named Fellow of the Leibniz Institute for Polymer Research Dresden
- 2015 Honorary Doctor of Technology, Linköping University
- 2016-2022 Visiting professor Linkoping University
- Since 2017 J. A. Woollam Distinguished Professorship of Electrical and Computer Engineering, in honor of John Woollam
- 2025 elected Fellow of the National Academy of Inventors
- 2026 Founding member and President of the North American Ellipsometry Association

== Publications ==
Schubert has published 338 articles, book chapters, and books, gathering more than 11,400 citations, according to Google Scholar.
