= Nanocharm =

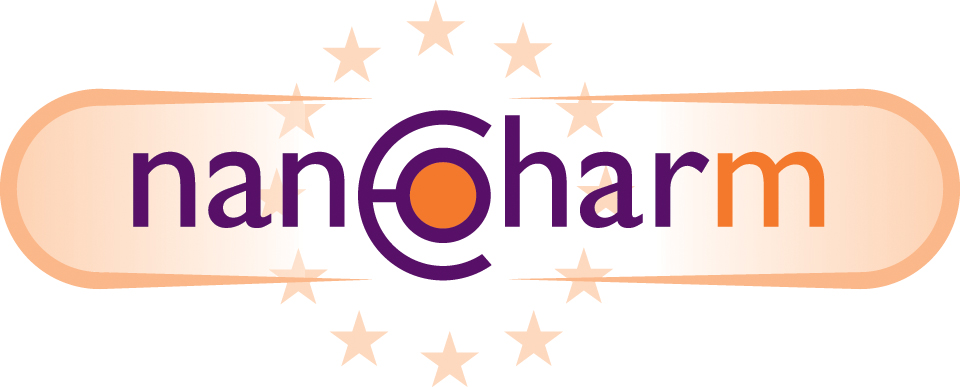
NanoCharm's logo

NanoCharm is a cooperation of eight European organisations and is an EU-Project funded in the 7th framework program. The goal of this European collaboration is to establish and enhance ellipsometry and polarimetry as a measurement tool.

== The partners ==
Italy	CNR-IMIP Bari (Coordinator)
France	CNRS Palaiseau Paris
Austria	University Linz
Czech Republic	University Brno
Germany	ISAS Berlin
Serbia	Institute of Physics, Belgrade
United Kingdom	Institute of Nanotechnology, Stirling, Scotland, UK
France	Horiba Jobin Yvon

== Projects and goals ==
Ellipsometry and polarimetry are methods to characterize samples according to their optical properties and composition. The measurements do not influence or destroy the samples and are calculated in real-time experiments. Therefore, these methods are suitable for characterizing samples in-situ and to further monitor the growth process.

The NanoCharm project aims to strengthen the collaboration of users (scientific and industrial) and their needs with the manufacturers of ellipsometers.

For this reason, the NanoCharm consortium is organising annual summer and winter schools during the three years of the project (from 1 January 2008 until 31 December 2010). Additionally, a website has been established to act as a platform for all users. The website provides news, a collection of literature, databases, a virtual lab and a forum for discussion.
