= John Woollam =

John Woollam may refer to:

- John Woollam (physicist), American physicist
- John Woollam (politician) (1927–2006), British politician
