= Photoelastic modulator =

A photoelastic modulator (PEM) is an optical device used to modulate the polarization of a light source. The photoelastic effect is used to change the birefringence of the optical element in the photoelastic modulator.

PEM was first invented by J. Badoz in the 1960s and originally called a "birefringence modulator." It was initially developed for physical measurements including optical rotary dispersion and Faraday rotation, polarimetry of astronomical objects, strain-induced birefringence, and ellipsometry. Later developers of the photoelastic modulator include J.C Kemp, S.N Jasperson and S.E Schnatterly.

== Description ==
The basic design of a photoelastic modulator consists of a piezoelectric transducer and a half wave resonant bar; the bar being a transparent material (now most commonly fused silica). The transducer is tuned to the natural frequency of the bar. This resonance modulation results in highly sensitive polarization measurements. The fundamental vibration of the optic is along its longest dimension.

== Basic principles ==
The principle of operation of photoelastic modulators is based on the photoelastic effect, in which a mechanically stressed sample exhibits birefringence proportional to the resulting strain. Photoelastic modulators are resonant devices where the precise oscillation frequency is determined by the properties of the optical element/transducer assembly. The transducer is tuned to the resonance frequency of the optical element along its long dimension, determined by its length and the speed of sound in the material. A current is then sent through the transducer to vibrate the optical element through stretching and compressing which changes the birefringence of the transparent material. Because of this resonant character, the birefringence of the optical element can be modulated to large amplitudes, but also by the same reason, the operation of a PEM is limited to a single frequency, and most commercial devices manufactured today operate at about 50 kHz.

== Applications ==
=== Polarization modulation of a light source ===
This is the most basic application and function of a PEM. In a typical setup, where original light source is linearly polarized at 45 degrees from the optical axis of the PEM, the resulting polarization of light is modulated at the PEM operating frequency f, and for a sinusoidal modulating signal, it can be expressed in Jones matrix formalism as:

$$\psi = \frac{1}{\sqrt{2}}\left(\begin{matrix}1 \\ e^{i A \sin 2 \pi f t} \end{matrix} \right)$$

where A is the amplitude of the modulation.

Linearly polarized, monochromatic light impinging at 45 degrees to the optical axis can be thought of as the sum of two components, one parallel and one perpendicular to the optical axis of the PEM. The birefringence introduced in the plate will retard one of these components more than the other, that is the PEM acts as a tunable wave plate. Typically it is adjusted to be either a quarter wave or half wave plate at the peak of the oscillation.

For the quarter wave plate case, the amplitude of oscillation is adjusted so that at the given wavelength one component is alternately retarded and advanced 90 degrees relative to the other, so that the exiting light is alternately right-hand and left-hand circularly polarized at the peaks.

A reference signal is taken from the modulator oscillator and is used to drive a phase-sensitive detector, the demodulator.

The amplitude of oscillation is adjusted by an external applied voltage that is proportional to the wavelength of the light passing through the modulator.

=== Polarimetry ===
A typical polarimetric setup consists of two linear polarizers forming a crossed analyzer setup, an optical sample introducing the change in the polarization of light, and a PEM further modulating the polarization state. The final detected intensities at the fundamental and second harmonic of PEM operating frequency depend on the ellipticity and rotation introduced by the sample.

PEM polarimetry has the advantage that the signal is modulated at a high frequency (and often detected with a lock-in amplifier), excluding many sources of noise not at the PEM operating frequency and attenuating the white noise by the bandwidth of the lock-in amplifier.

== See also ==
- Circular dichroism
- Phase modulator for ellipsometry
- Photoelasticity
