= Henry Hurwitz Jr. =

American physicist (1918 – 1992

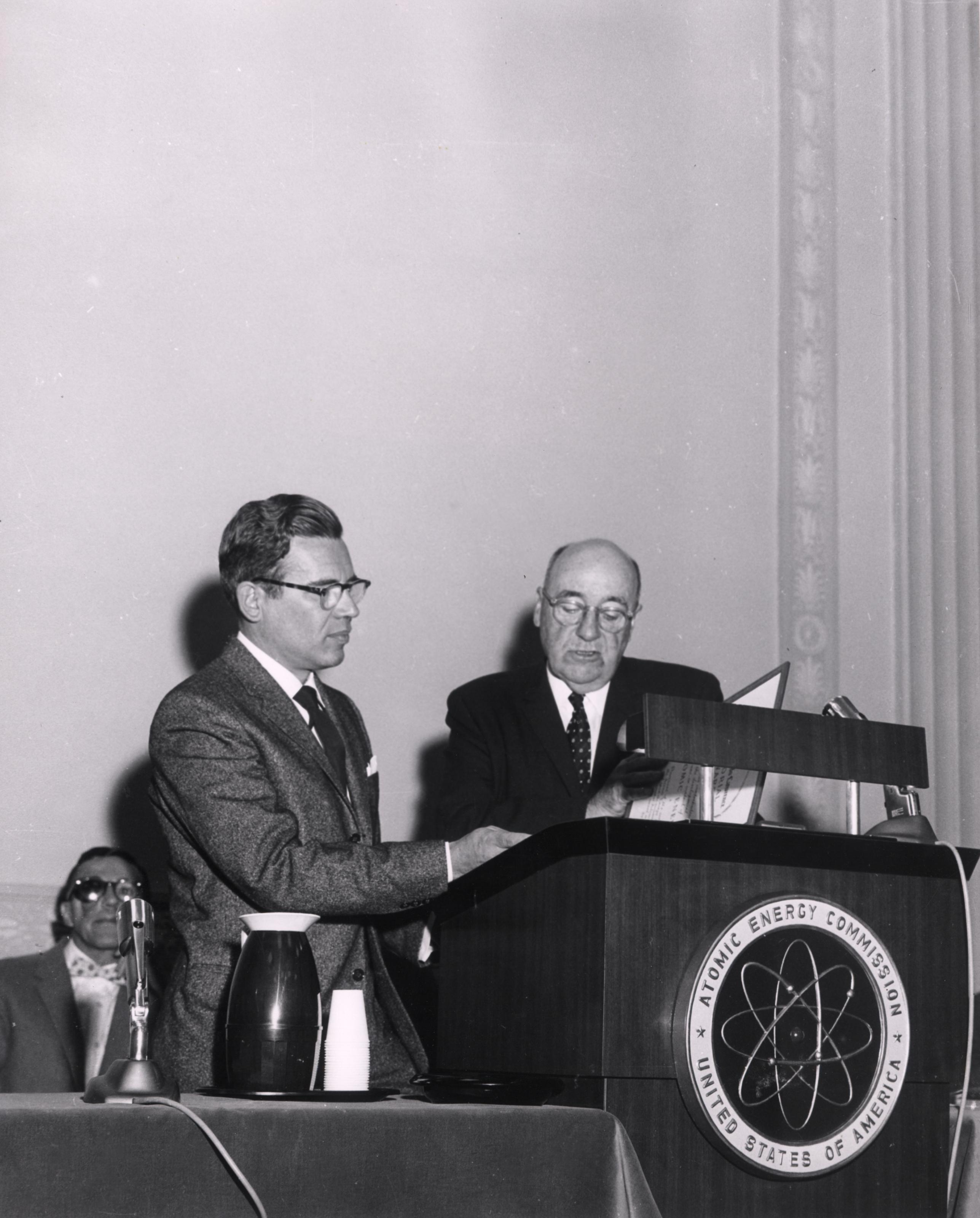
- Hurwitz (left) receiving the E.O. Lawrence Award in 1961
- Born: December 25, 1918
- Died: April 14, 1992 (aged 73)
- Education: Cornell University (1938); Harvard University (1941)
- Employer(s): Manhattan Project; General Electric Company
- Spouse: Alma Rosenbaum (m. 1951)
- Parent: Henry Hurwitz Sr.

Henry Hurwitz Jr. (December 25, 1918 – April 14, 1992) was a physicist at General Electric Company who pioneered the theory and design of nuclear power plants and helped engineer the reactor for the Seawolf nuclear submarine.

== Biography ==
He was born in Manhattan on December 25, 1918. He graduated from Cornell University in 1938, with an M.S. in physics. He then went to Harvard University in 1939 and received a Ph.D. in quantum mechanics in 1941. To describe the manipulation of polarized light, Hurwitz used linear algebra with R. Clark Jones, a method Jones went on to develop into the Jones calculus.

In 1943 he was recruited by Hans Bethe to help Edward Teller's staff of researchers at the Los Alamos National Laboratory in New Mexico develop the thermonuclear reactions for the hydrogen bomb. In 1946, Hurwitz became one of the first scientists to work at GE's Knolls Atomic Power Laboratory in Schenectady, New York. In 1947 he transferred to the GE Research and Development Center to become manager of the Nucleonics and Radiation Branch. His team of scientists used advanced theta-pinch techniques to harness fusion reactions.

In 1955, a year after Fortune Magazine named him as one of the top 10 scientists in U.S. industry, Hurwitz contributed to establishing the first atomic containment sphere for GE. The development advanced industry-wide safety protocols for enclosing nuclear reactors. He held 15 patents. He was elected in 1953 a Fellow of the American Physical Society.

His interest in electronic devices, computer applications, and chemical engineering prompted GE to recognize Hurwitz's accomplishments in 1975 by naming him a Coolidge Fellow, the GE R&D Center's highest honor. Hurwitz also is noted for his efforts to raise awareness about the dangers of radon, and later received the Glenn T. Seaborg Medal in 1989 from the American Nuclear Society.

... in his later years he became a competitive downhill skier, windsurfer and sailor, and he was very proud of earning medals in these endeavors. Once he had mastered sailing to his own satisfaction, he contributed to its science with a technical paper in Yachting Magazine on an optimal strategy for sailing upwind.

He died on April 14, 1992, in Schenectady, New York, of cancer, at age 73.
