= Photo-reflectance =

Conventional photo-reflectance setup

Photo-reflectance is an optical technique for investigating the material and electronic properties of thin films. Photo-reflectance measures the change in reflectivity of a sample in response to the application of an amplitude modulated light beam. Due to the small size of the induced reflectivity changes, phase-locked detection methods centered on an applied modulation are required. Generally, a photo-reflectometer consists of an intensity modulated "pump" light beam used to modulate the reflectivity of the sample, a second "probe" light beam used to measure the reflectance of the sample, an optical system for directing the pump and probe beams to the sample, and for directing the reflected probe light onto a photodetector, and a signal processor to record the differential reflectance. The photo-reflectance signal may be recorded as a function of probe beam wavelength.

The utility of photo-reflectance for characterization of semiconductor samples has been recognized since the late 1960s. In particular, conventional photo-reflectance is closely related to electroreflectance in that the sample's internal electric field is modulated by the photo-injection of electron-hole pairs. The electro-reflectance response is sharply peaked near semiconductor interband transitions, which accounts for its usefulness in semiconductor characterization. Photo-reflectance spectroscopy has been used to determine semiconductor bandstructures, internal electric fields, and other material properties such as crystallinity, composition, physical strain, and doping concentration.

== Etymology ==
The term "photo-reflectance effect" refers to the effect of an incident light beam on the reflectance of a sample. "Photo-reflectance" refers to a technique to measure changes in the reflectance of a sample in response an applied light. This applied (or "pump") light is typically modulated at a known frequency so that a lock-in amplifier may be used to suppress unwanted noise, resulting in the ability to detect sample reflectance changes at the ppm level. The technique has also been referred to as "photo-modulated reflectance," "modulated photo-reflectance," "modulated optical reflectance," and "photo-modulated optical reflectance." The term "conventional photoreflectance," in specific contexts, may refer to detection of an electroreflectance response. Conventional photoreflectance has been known at least since 1967.

== Basic principles ==
Photo-reflectance is a convenient type of modulation spectroscopy, as it may be performed at room temperature and only requires the sample have a reflecting surface. It is an established tool for non-contact determination of material and electronic properties of semiconductor films. In photo-reflectance, a pump laser beam is used to modulate the free charge density in a semiconductor sample (via photo-injection), thereby modulating one or more physical quantities (e.g. the internal electric field). The measured signal ΔR is the change in amplitude of the reflected probe light as the intensity modulated pump radiation interacts with the sample. The normalized signal is ΔR/R, i.e. the pump-induced change in reflectance (AC) divided by the baseline reflectance (DC). The conventional photo-reflectance apparatus uses a spectroscopic source for the probe beam, such that the signal may be recorded as a function of the probe light's wavelength. In general, the signal may be written:

$$\frac{\Delta R}{R} = \alpha \Delta {\epsilon}_1 + \beta \Delta {\epsilon}_2$$

where ΔR/R is the normalized change in reflectance, α (≡1/R×∂R/∂ε_{1}) and β (≡1/R×∂R/∂ε_{2}) are the "Seraphin coefficients" which contain filmstack information, and Δε_{1} and Δε_{2} are the pump induced changes in the complex dielectric function. In conventional photo-reflectance analysis, a fit to the signal is performed using the conventional expression for electromodulation as given by Aspnes. This fit procedure yields the interband transition energies, amplitudes, and widths. However, because the signal depends on the uniformity of the perturbation, the extraction of such parameters must be treated with care.

== Experimental setup ==
The conventional photo-reflectance setup uses a xenon or tungsten based lamp source passed through a monochromator to form the incident probe beam. The pump beam may be formed by the output of a continuous wave (CW) laser (e.g. a He-Ne or He-Cd laser) passed through a chopper wheel, or may be formed by the output of a directly modulated semiconductor diode laser. The pump beam is focused to a spot on the sample where it interacts with the sample. The probe beam is co-focused onto the sample where it is reflected. The reflected probe beam is collected and passed through an optical filter to eliminate any unwanted pump light and/or photoluminescence signal. Thereafter the probe beam is directed onto a photodetector (e.g. a Si or InGaAs photodiode), which converts the probe intensity to an electrical signal. The electrical signal is processed to eliminate unwanted noise, typically using a lock-in circuit referenced to the modulation frequency. The photo-reflectance signal is then recorded as a function of probe beam wavelength using a computer or the like.

== Experimental considerations ==
In photo-reflectance, the sample's internal electric field is modulated by photo-injection of electron-hole pairs from an amplitude modulated pump beam (i.e. reducing the latent field). Phase-locked detection is a practical necessity due to the small size of the experimental signals (~ppm) and the unique ability of phase-locked detection methods to reject noise outside a narrow bandwidth centered on the modulation frequency. To achieve photo-injection, the energy of photons in the pump beam must exceed the band gap of material within the sample. Any photo-injection of electron-hole pairs from the CW probe or any quasi-static component of the pump will necessarily offset the sample baseline condition by reducing the latent field.

== Applications ==
PR spectra from a semiconductor heterostructure

PR vector data from various shallow junctions

Z-scan PR data and fit for measuring carrier transport parameters

Photo-reflectance is a highly sensitive measurement technique for characterizing the material and electronic properties of thin films. Photo-reflectance has been particularly important in basic research on semiconductors due to its ability to precisely determine semiconductor bandstructures. As an optical technique, photo-reflectance is suited to industrial applications because it is non-contact, and because it has good spatial resolution. However, the need for spectroscopic information has limited measurement speed, and consequently the adoption of spectroscopic photo-reflectance in industrial applications.

Single wavelength photo-reflectance techniques have been implemented in semiconductor manufacturing process control. For example, in the 1980s, Therma-Wave, Inc. introduced the "Therma-Probe" photo-modulated reflectance system for monitoring of the ion implantation process in silicon semiconductor manufacturing. The Therma-Probe focused an intensity modulated pump laser beam onto a spot on a silicon sample, modulating the sample reflectance. The reflectance changes were detected by a coincident laser probe beam of 633 nanometer wavelength. At this wavelength, the physical mechanisms responsible for the reflectance changes are thermo-modulation and the Drude free carrier effect. Since the thermo-modulation signal is primarily sensitive to ion implant damage, whenever an ion implanted wafer is thoroughly annealed the Therma-Probe signal decreases dramatically. However, measurement systems such as the Therma-Probe have proven useful in process control of microelectronics manufacturing because they provide the ability to verify the correct execution of process steps without contacting the wafer or removing the wafer from the clean room. Generally a number of measurements will be made on certain areas of the wafer and compared with expected values. As long as the measured values are within a certain range, the wafers are passed for continued processing (known as statistical process control). Other photo-modulated reflectance systems marketed for process control of implant processes are the "TWIN" metrology system marketed by PVA TePla AG, and the "PMR-3000" marketed by Semilab Co. Ltd.

In the 2000s, Xitronix Corporation introduced a photo-reflectance system for process control of new annealing processes and advanced strained silicon processes. The Xitronix system uses a ~375 nanometer wavelength laser probe beam. For silicon, at this wavelength the physical mechanism responsible for reflectance changes is electro-modulation. Since the electro-modulation signal is primarily sensitive to electrical activation and crystallinity, whenever an ion implanted wafer is annealed the Xitronix signal increases dramatically. More recently, the use of laser photo-reflectance for precision measurement of carrier diffusion lengths, recombination lifetimes, and mobilities has been reported.

== Spectroscopic vs. laser photo-reflectance ==
PR setup with laser probe

"Bright" PR configuration

Spectroscopic photo-reflectance employs a broad band probe light source, which may cover wavelengths from the infrared to the ultraviolet. By fitting spectroscopic photo-reflectance data with the conventional third derivative functional form, a comprehensive set of interband transition energies, amplitudes, and widths may be obtained, providing an essentially complete characterization of the electronic properties of the sample of interest. However, due to the need to keep the probe light intensity to a minimum and to the practical necessity of phase-locked detection, spectroscopic photo-reflectance measurements must be made sequentially, i.e. probe one wavelength at a time. This has limited the speed of spectroscopic photo-reflectance measurements, and coupled with the need for a careful fit procedure, renders spectroscopic photo-reflectance more suitable for analytical applications. Conversely, laser photo-reflectance employs a monochromatic light source, and hence is well suited for industrial applications whenever spectroscopic information is not needed.

Various attempts to increase the speed of spectroscopic photo-reflectance have been made by means of first illuminating the sample with a spectroscopic probe beam, then, after reflection from the sample, dispersing the constituent reflected probe beam wavelengths onto a photosensor array such that spectroscopic data may be transduced in parallel. However, the sensitivity of multichannel configurations is lower than the sensitivity of the conventional one-channel detection approach because illumination of the sample by the entire spectrum of probe light results in a higher probe-generated photovoltage, thereby reducing the baseline surface band bending (and the achievable signal).

== Advantages ==
- Photo-reflectance measures differential reflectivities as small as one part per million, whereas ellipsometry and/or standard reflectance measure differential reflectivities on the order of one part per thousand.
- Photo-reflectance spectra exhibits sharp derivative-like structures localized at interband transition energies, whereas ellipsometry and/or standard reflectance exhibit broad slowly varying spectra.
- The photo-reflectance response at a particular wavelength typically arises from specific interband transitions confined to specific materials within the sample.
- By using phase-locked detection methods, ambient (nonsynchronous) light does not influence photo-reflectance measurements.
- Laser photo-reflectance has been proven in statistical process control for microelectronics manufacturing for over three decades.

== See also ==
- Spectroscopy
- Ellipsometry
- Photoluminescence
- Raman spectroscopy
- Surface photovoltage
- Terahertz time-domain spectroscopy
- Optically detected magnetic resonance
- Magneto-optic Kerr effect
