= Ellipsometry =

Optical technique for characterizing thin films

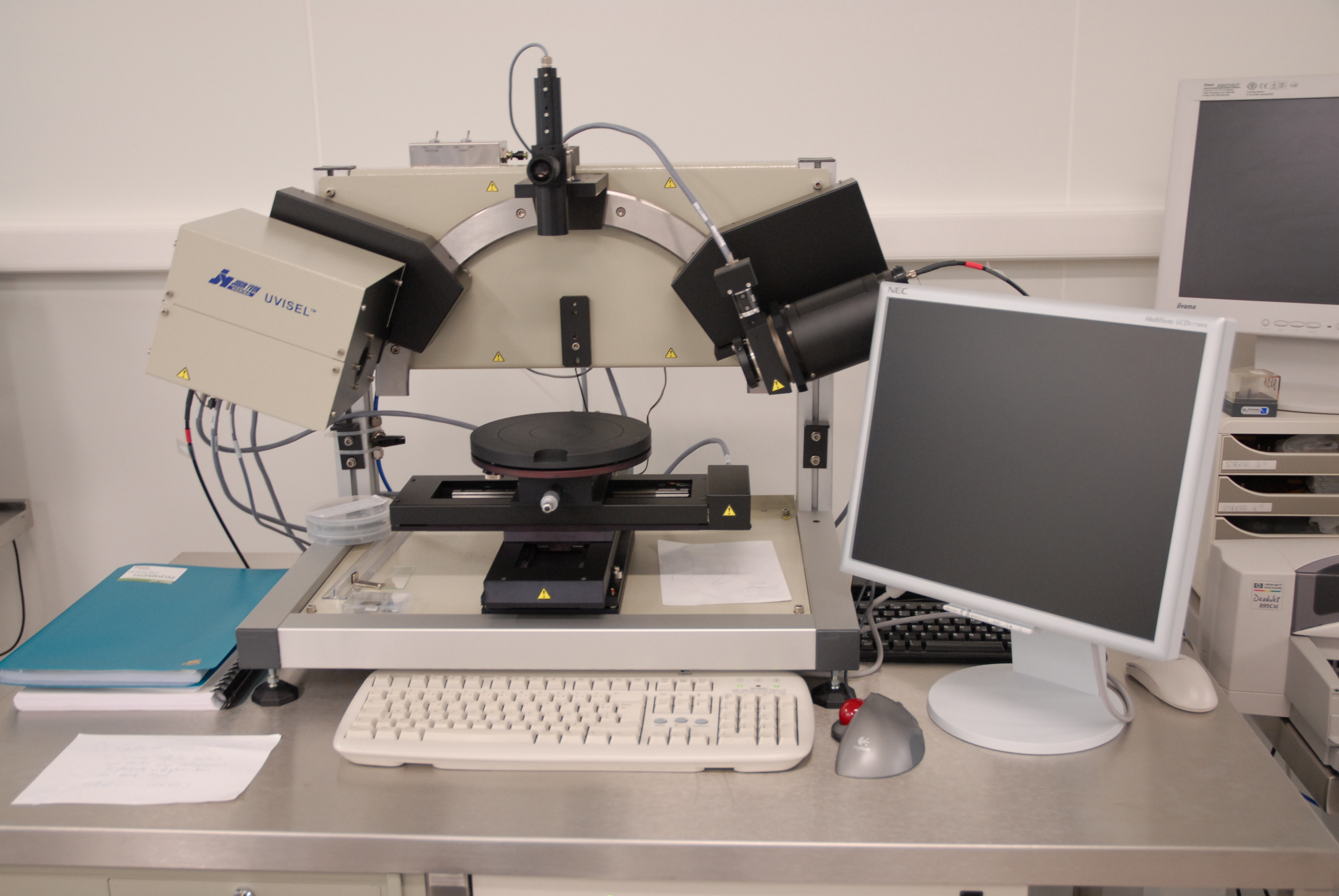
An Ellipsometer at LAAS-CNRS in Toulouse, France

Ellipsometry is an optical technique for investigating the dielectric properties (complex refractive index or dielectric function) of thin films. Ellipsometry measures the change of polarization upon reflection or transmission and compares it to a model.

It can be used to characterize composition, roughness, thickness (depth), crystalline nature, doping concentration, electrical conductivity and other material properties. It is very sensitive to the change in the optical response of incident radiation that interacts with the material being investigated.

A spectroscopic ellipsometer can be found in most thin film analytical labs. Ellipsometry is also becoming more interesting to researchers in other disciplines such as biology and medicine. These areas pose new challenges to the technique, such as measurements on unstable liquid surfaces and microscopic imaging.

== Etymology ==
The name "ellipsometry" stems from the fact that elliptical polarization of light is used. The term "spectroscopic" relates to the fact that the information gained is a function of the light's wavelength or energy (spectra). The technique has been known at least since 1888 by the work of Paul Drude and has many applications today.

The first documented use of the term "ellipsometry" was in 1945.

== Basic principles ==
The measured signal is the change in polarization as the incident radiation (in a known state) interacts with the material structure of interest (reflected, absorbed, scattered, or transmitted). The polarization change is quantified by the amplitude ratio, Ψ, and the phase difference, Δ (defined below). Because the signal depends on the thickness as well as the material properties, ellipsometry can be a universal tool for contact free determination of thickness and optical constants of films of all kinds.

Upon the analysis of the change of polarization of light, ellipsometry can yield information about layers that are thinner than the wavelength of the probing light itself, even down to a single atomic layer. Ellipsometry can probe the complex refractive index or dielectric function tensor, which gives access to fundamental physical parameters like those listed above. It is commonly used to characterize film thickness for single layers or complex multilayer stacks ranging from a few angstroms or tenths of a nanometer to several micrometers with an excellent accuracy.

== Experimental details ==
Typically, ellipsometry is done only in the reflection setup. The exact nature of the polarization change is determined by the sample's properties (thickness, complex refractive index or dielectric function tensor). Although optical techniques are inherently diffraction-limited, ellipsometry exploits phase information (polarization state), and can achieve sub-nanometer resolution. In its simplest form, the technique is applicable to thin films with thickness of less than a nanometer to several micrometers. Most models assume the sample is composed of a small number of discrete, well-defined layers that are optically homogeneous and isotropic. Violation of these assumptions requires more advanced variants of the technique (see below).

Methods of immersion or multiangular ellipsometry are applied to find the optical constants of the material with rough sample surface or presence of inhomogeneous media. New methodological approaches allow the use of reflection ellipsometry to measure physical and technical characteristics of gradient elements in case the surface layer of the optical detail is inhomogeneous.

=== Experimental setup ===
Schematic setup of an ellipsometry experiment

Electromagnetic radiation is emitted by a light source and linearly polarized by a polarizer. It can pass through an optional compensator (retarder, quarter wave plate) and falls onto the sample. After reflection the radiation passes a compensator (optional) and a second polarizer, which is called an analyzer, and falls into the detector. Instead of the compensators, some ellipsometers use a phase-modulator in the path of the incident light beam. Ellipsometry is a specular optical technique (the angle of incidence equals the angle of reflection). The incident and the reflected beam span the plane of incidence. Light which is polarized parallel to this plane is named p-polarized. A polarization direction perpendicular is called s-polarized (s-polarised), accordingly. The "s" is contributed from the German "senkrecht" (perpendicular).

=== Data acquisition ===
Ellipsometry measures the complex reflectance ratio $\rho$ of a system, which may be parametrized by the amplitude component $\Psi$ and the phase difference $\Delta$. The polarization state of the light incident upon the sample may be decomposed into an s and a p component (the s component is oscillating perpendicular to the plane of incidence and parallel to the sample surface, and the p component is oscillating parallel to the plane of incidence). The amplitudes of the s and p components, after reflection and normalized to their initial value, are denoted by $r_s$ and $r_p$ respectively. The angle of incidence is chosen close to the Brewster angle of the sample to ensure a maximal difference in $r_p$ and $r_s$. Ellipsometry measures the complex reflectance ratio $\rho$ (a complex quantity), which is the ratio of $r_p$ over $r_s$:

$$\rho = \frac{r_p}{r_s} = \tan \Psi \cdot e^{i\Delta}.$$

Thus, $\tan\Psi$ is the amplitude ratio upon reflection, and $\Delta$ is the phase shift (difference). It is helpful to note that the right side of the equation is another way to represent a complex number. Since ellipsometry is measuring the ratio (or difference) of two values rather than the absolute value of either, it is less sensitive to variation than other optical techniques, making it robust and reproducible. For instance, it is relatively insensitive to scatter and fluctuations and requires no standard sample or reference beam.

=== Data analysis ===
Ellipsometry is an indirect method, i.e. in general the measured $\Psi$ and $\Delta$ cannot be converted directly into the optical constants of the sample. Normally, a model analysis must be performed, for example the Forouhi Bloomer model. This is one weakness of ellipsometry. Models can be physically based on energy transitions or simply free parameters used to fit the data.

Direct inversion of $\Psi$ and $\Delta$ is only possible in very simple cases of isotropic, homogeneous and infinitely thick films. In all other cases a layer model must be established, which considers the optical constants (refractive index or dielectric function tensor) and thickness parameters of all individual layers of the sample including the correct layer sequence. Using an iterative procedure (least-squares minimization) unknown optical constants and/or thickness parameters are varied, and $\Psi$ and $\Delta$ values are calculated using the Fresnel equations. The calculated $\Psi$ and $\Delta$ values which match the experimental data best provide the optical constants and thickness parameters of the sample.

== Definitions ==
Modern ellipsometers are complex instruments that incorporate a wide variety of radiation sources, detectors, digital electronics and software. The range of wavelength employed may be far in excess of what is visible to human eyes.

=== Single-wavelength vs. spectroscopic ellipsometry ===
Single-wavelength ellipsometry (SWE) employs a monochromatic light source, which is usually a laser in the visible spectral region, for instance, a HeNe laser with a wavelength of 632.8 nm. Therefore, single-wavelength ellipsometry is also called laser ellipsometry. The advantage of laser ellipsometry is that laser beams can be focused on a small spot size, and is more precise than Spectroscopic ellipsometry. Furthermore, lasers have a higher power than broad band light sources. Therefore, laser ellipsometry can be used for imaging (see below). However, the experimental output is restricted to only two parameters (one set of $\Psi$ and $\Delta$ values per measurement). Due to these limitations, SWE is limited to a single layer system.

By contrast Spectroscopic ellipsometry (SE) employs broad band light sources, which cover the infrared, visible and/or ultraviolet spectral region. By that the complex refractive index or the dielectric function tensor in the corresponding spectral region can be obtained. Infrared spectroscopic ellipsometry (IRSE) can probe lattice vibrational (phonon) and free charge carrier (plasmon) properties. Spectroscopic ellipsometry in the near infrared, visible up to ultraviolet spectral region studies the refractive index in the transparency or below-band-gap region and electronic properties, for instance, band-to-band transitions or excitons. When measuring thickness, lower wavelength ranges are utilized for thinner films, while longer wavelength ranges (for example Infrared) are utilized for thicker films.

=== Standard vs. generalized ellipsometry (anisotropy) ===
Standard ellipsometry (often shortened to 'ellipsometry') is applied when no s polarized light is converted into p polarized light or vice versa. This is the case for optically isotropic samples, for instance, amorphous materials or crystalline materials with a cubic crystal structure. Standard ellipsometry is also sufficient for optically uniaxial samples in the special case, when the optical axis is aligned parallel to the surface normal. In all other cases, when s polarized light is converted into p polarized light and/or vice versa, the generalized ellipsometry approach must be applied. Examples are arbitrarily aligned, optically uniaxial samples, or optically biaxial samples.

=== Jones matrix vs. Mueller matrix formalism (depolarization) ===
There are typically two different ways of mathematically describing how an electromagnetic wave interacts with the elements within an ellipsometer (including the sample): the Jones matrix and the Mueller matrix formalisms. In the Jones matrix formalism, the electromagnetic wave is described by a Jones vector with two orthogonal complex-valued entries for the electric field (typically $E_x$ and $E_y$), and the effect that an optical element (or sample) has on it is described by the complex-valued 2×2 Jones matrix. In the Mueller matrix formalism, the electromagnetic wave is described by Stokes vectors with four real-valued entries, and their transformation is described by the real-valued 4x4 Mueller matrix. When no depolarization occurs both formalisms are fully consistent. Therefore, for non-depolarizing samples, the simpler Jones matrix formalism is sufficient. If the sample is depolarizing the Mueller matrix formalism should be used, because it also gives the amount of depolarization. Reasons for depolarization are, for instance, thickness non-uniformity or backside-reflections from a transparent substrate.

== Advanced experimental approaches ==
=== Imaging ellipsometry ===
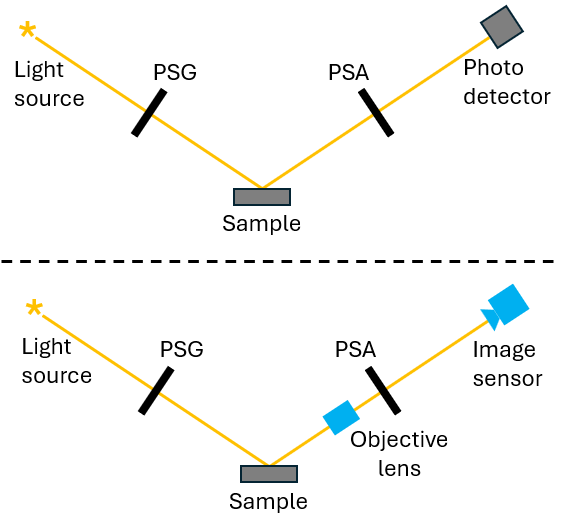
Schematic comparison of classical (top) and imaging (bottom) ellipsometer setups. PSG and PSA stand for polarization state generator and polarization state analyzer, respectively.

Imaging ellipsometry (IE) extends classical ellipsometry by integrating an objective lens and an image sensor (e.g. CCD or CMOS image sensor). The objective lens projects the illuminated sample area onto the detector, which enables real-time high-contrast visualization and spatially resolved ellipsometry measurements. IE is particularly suited for structured or inhomogeneous thin-film samples. It provides detailed information about film thickness distributions, surface uniformity, and dynamic processes such as molecular adsorption or film growth. IE combines the quantitative precision of ellipsometry with the lateral resolution of microscopy.

In contrast to classical ellipsometry, IE captures thousands of data points simultaneously, inherently producing two-dimensional data maps. Ψ-Δ or Mueller matrix values can be produced for each pixel by applying algorithms for standard or generalized ellipsometry (e.g. nulling or rotating compensator). These can be converted into physical material properties like film thickness, refractive index, anisotropy or depolarization using optical modelling software.

A wide variety of suitable light sources is routinely used with IE. These range from monochromatic laser devices, to multi-wavelength assemblies of high-power light-emitting diodes (LEDs), to continuously tunable sources. Imaging Spectroscopic Ellipsometry (ISE) combines the features of IE with the advantages of spectroscopic optical characterization. ISE is typically employed in the spectral range between 190 nm and 1700 nm, due to technological restrictions of imaging components and sensors. It has become a powerful tool in many disciplines of modern science and technology, particularly in 2D material research, MEMS applications, and display inspection.

=== In situ ellipsometry ===
In situ ellipsometry refers to dynamic measurements during the modification process of a sample. This process can be used to study, for instance, the growth of a thin film, including calcium phosphate mineralization at the air-liquid interface, etching or cleaning of a sample. By in situ ellipsometry measurements it is possible to determine fundamental process parameters, such as, growth or etch rates, variation of optical properties with time. In situ ellipsometry measurements require a number of additional considerations: The sample spot is usually not as easily accessible as for ex situ measurements outside the process chamber. Therefore, the mechanical setup has to be adjusted, which can include additional optical elements (mirrors, prisms, or lenses) for redirecting or focusing the light beam. Because the environmental conditions during the process can be harsh, the sensitive optical elements of the ellipsometry setup must be separated from the hot zone. In the simplest case this is done by optical view ports, though strain induced birefringence of the (glass-) windows has to be taken into account or minimized. Furthermore, the samples can be at elevated temperatures, which implies different optical properties compared to samples at room temperature. Despite all these problems, in situ ellipsometry becomes more and more important as process control technique for thin film deposition and modification tools. In situ ellipsometers can be of single-wavelength or spectroscopic type. Spectroscopic in situ ellipsometers use multichannel detectors, for instance CCD detectors, which measure the ellipsometric parameters for all wavelengths in the studied spectral range simultaneously.

=== Ellipsometric porosimetry ===
Ellipsometric porosimetry measures the change of the optical properties and thickness of the materials during adsorption and desorption of a volatile species at atmospheric pressure or under reduced pressure depending on the application. The EP technique is unique in its ability to measure porosity of very thin films down to 10 nm, its reproducibility and speed of measurement. Compared to traditional porosimeters, Ellipsometer porosimeters are well suited to very thin film pore size and pore size distribution measurement. Film porosity is a key factor in silicon based technology using low-κ materials, organic industry (encapsulated organic light-emitting diodes) as well as in the coating industry using sol gel techniques.

=== Magneto-optic generalized ellipsometry ===
Magneto-optic generalized ellipsometry (MOGE) is an advanced infrared spectroscopic ellipsometry technique for studying free charge carrier properties in conducting samples. By applying an external magnetic field it is possible to determine independently the density, the optical mobility parameter and the effective mass parameter of free charge carriers. Without the magnetic field only two out of the three free charge carrier parameters can be extracted independently.

=== Ellipsometry in semiconductor manufacturing ===
Using spectroscopic ellipsometry an analysis method first developed for semiconductors has been adopted more widely. In this method complex multi-layers stacks made of multiple mediums are capable of being measured at the same time if each layer has known optical properties. Because of the optical properties are known, all of the unknowns are wavelength independent. In this case, a linear regression can be applied to $\Psi$ and $\Delta$, from which one can extract the thickness of all layers, as well as the volume fractions.

This method works well in semiconductor manufacturing because a library of known Refractive index (n) and Extinction coefficient (k) for the materials used during manufacturing can be developed. In the case of semiconductor development where the material properties are unknown, this process can be used in reverse, and it is possible to extract the n and k values by measuring the thickness of the sample using another technique such as TEM. These material properties can then be used to measure the thickness of future samples of the same material.

Unlike XRF or XPS which can measure much thicker metal films or is more precise, respectively, ellipsometry is valued for its speed. Because ellipsometry can be done without a vacuum system the time to load samples is significantly faster. Additionally, unlike X-ray based techniques which require a few seconds to many minutes per site measured, ellipsometry generally takes less than one second per site.

== Applications ==
This technique has found applications in many different fields, from semiconductor physics to microelectronics and biology, from basic research to industrial applications. Ellipsometry is a very sensitive measurement technique and provides unequaled capabilities for thin film metrology. As an optical technique, spectroscopic ellipsometry is non-destructive and contactless. Because the incident radiation can be focused, small sample sizes can be imaged and desired characteristics can be mapped over a larger area (m^{2}).

== Advantages ==
Ellipsometry has a number of advantages compared to standard reflection intensity measurements:

- Ellipsometry measures at least two parameters at each wavelength of the spectrum. If generalized ellipsometry is applied up to 16 parameters can be measured at each wavelength.
- Ellipsometry measures an intensity ratio instead of pure intensities. Therefore, ellipsometry is less affected by intensity instabilities of the light source or atmospheric absorption.
- By using polarized light, normal ambient unpolarized stray light does not significantly influence the measurement, no dark box is necessary.
- No reference measurement is necessary.

Ellipsometry is especially superior to reflectivity measurements when studying anisotropic samples.

== See also ==
- Petrographic microscope
- Photo-reflectance
- Polarimetry
- Spectroscopy
