= Robert Clark Jones =

American physicist (1916–2004)

- Born: June 30, 1916; Toledo, U.S.
- Died: April 26, 2004 (aged 87)
- Known for: Jones calculus Specific detectivity
- Awards: Adolph Lomb Medal of the OSA (1941); Frederic Ives Medal of the OSA (1972); Dennis Gabor Award of the SPIE (1989); G. G. Stokes Award of the SPIE (2004)
- Scientific career
- Fields: Physicist

R. Clark Jones (June 30, 1916 – April 26, 2004) was an American physicist working in the field of optics. He studied at Harvard University and received his PhD in 1941. He worked at Bell Labs until 1944, and later with the Polaroid Corporation until 1982. In a sequence of publications between 1941 and 1956, he demonstrated a mathematical model to describe the polarization of coherent light, the Jones calculus.

When William Shurcliff wrote Polarized Light: Production and Use he praised R. C. Jones in the preface: "The author’s debt to Dr. R. Clark Jones, the inventor of the Jones calculus, is immeasurable. The sections dealing with the Stokes vector, the Mueller calculus, and the Jones calculus could not have been written without long and painstaking coaching by him."

== Publications ==
- Jones, R. Clark (1939). "On The Relativistic Doppler Effect". Journal of the Optical Society of America. 29 (8): 337–338. doi:10.1364/JOSA.29.000337.
- Jones, R. Clark (1939). "The Koremetron: An Instrument for Measuring Pupillary Diameters". Journal of the Optical Society of America. 29 (12): 531–534. Bibcode:1939JOSA...29..531J. doi:10.1364/JOSA.29.000531.
- Jones, R. Clark (1941). "A new calculus for the treatment of optical systems, I. Description and Discussion of the Calculus". Journal of the Optical Society of America. 31 (7): 488–493. Bibcode:1941JOSA...31..488J. doi:10.1364/JOSA.31.000488.
- Hurwitz, Henry; Jones, R. Clark (1941). "A new calculus for the treatment of optical systems, II. Proof of three general equivalence theorems". Journal of the Optical Society of America. 31 (7): 493–499. Bibcode:1941JOSA...31..493H. doi:10.1364/JOSA.31.000493.
- Jones, R. Clark (1941). "A new calculus for the treatment of optical systems, III The Sohncke Theory of optical activity". Journal of the Optical Society of America. 31 (7): 500–503. Bibcode:1941JOSA...31..500J. doi:10.1364/JOSA.31.000500.
- Jones, R. Clark (1942). "A new calculus for the treatment of optical systems, IV". Journal of the Optical Society of America. 32 (8): 486–493. Bibcode:1942JOSA...32..486J. doi:10.1364/JOSA.32.000486.
- Jones, R. Clark (1946). "Steady-State Load Curves for Semi-Conductor Bolometers". Journal of the Optical Society of America. 36 (8): 448–454. Bibcode:1946JOSA...36..448J. doi:10.1364/JOSA.36.000448.
- Jones, R. Clark (1947). "A new calculus for the treatment of optical systems, V. A more general formulation and description of another calculus". Journal of the Optical Society of America. 37 (2): 107–110. Bibcode:1947JOSA...37..107J. doi:10.1364/JOSA.37.000107.
- Jones, R. Clark (1947). "A new calculus for the treatment of optical systems, VI. Experimental determination of the matrix". Journal of the Optical Society of America. 37 (2): 110–112. Bibcode:1947JOSA...37..110J. doi:10.1364/JOSA.37.000110.
- Jones, R. Clark (1947). "The Ultimate Sensitivity of Radiation Detectors". Journal of the Optical Society of America. 37 (11): 879–888. doi:10.1364/JOSA.37.000879. PMID 18896762.
- Jones, R. Clark (1948). "A New Calculus for the Treatment of Optical Systems. VII. Properties of the N-Matrices". Journal of the Optical Society of America. 38 (8): 671–683. Bibcode:1948JOSA...38..671J. doi:10.1364/JOSA.38.000671.
- Jones, R. Clark (1949). "A New Classification System for Radiation Detectors". Journal of the Optical Society of America. 39 (5): 327–341. Bibcode:1949JOSA...39..327J. doi:10.1364/JOSA.39.000327. PMID 18131432.
- Jones, R. Clark (1949). "Erratum: The Ultimate Sensitivity of Radiation Detectors". Journal of the Optical Society of America. 39 (5): 343. doi:10.1364/JOSA.39.000343.
- Jones, R. Clark (1949). "Factors of Merit for Radiation Detectors". Journal of the Optical Society of America. 39 (5): 344–356. Bibcode:1949JOSA...39..344J. doi:10.1364/JOSA.39.000344. PMID 18144695.
- Jones, R. Clark; Jones, R. Clark (1949). "The Trapping of Fluorescent Light Produced within Objects of High Geometrical Symmetry". Journal of the Optical Society of America. 39 (11): 912–916. Bibcode:1949JOSA...39..912S. doi:10.1364/JOSA.39.000912.
- West, C. D.; Jones, R. Clark (1951). "On the Properties of Polarization Elements as Used in Optical Instruments. I. Fundamental Considerations". Journal of the Optical Society of America. 41 (12): 976–980. doi:10.1364/JOSA.41.000976.
- Jones, R. Clark; West, C. D. (1951). "On the Properties of Polarization Elements as Used in Optical Instruments. II. Sinusoidal Modulators". Journal of the Optical Society of America. 41 (12): 982–984. Bibcode:1951JOSA...41..982J. doi:10.1364/JOSA.41.000982.
- Jones, R. Clark (1953). "Performance of Detectors for Visible and Infrared Radiation". Advances in Electronics and Electron Physics. 5: 1–96. doi:10.1016/S0065-2539(08)60683-6. ISBN 9780120145058.
- Jones, R. Clark (1953). "The General Theory of Bolometer Performance". Journal of the Optical Society of America. 43 (1): 1–10. Bibcode:1953JOSA...43....1J. doi:10.1364/JOSA.43.000001.
- Jones, R. Clark (1953). "On Reversibility and Irreversibility in Optics". Journal of the Optical Society of America. 43 (2): 138–143. doi:10.1364/JOSA.43.000138.
- Jones, R. Clark (1953). "On the Relation between the Speed of Response and the Detectivity of Lead Sulfide Photoconductive Cells". Journal of the Optical Society of America. 43 (11): 1008–1013. Bibcode:1953JOSA...43.1008J. doi:10.1364/JOSA.43.001008.
- Jones, R. Clark (1955). "New Method of Describing and Measuring the Granularity of Photographic Materials". Journal of the Optical Society of America. 45 (10): 799–808. Bibcode:1955JOSA...45..799J. doi:10.1364/JOSA.45.000799.
- Jones, R. Clark (1956). "New Calculus for the Treatment of Optical Systems. VIII. Electromagnetic Theory". Journal of the Optical Society of America. 46 (2): 126–131. Bibcode:1956JOSA...46..126J. doi:10.1364/JOSA.46.000126.
- Jones, R. Clark (1956). "Transmittance of a Train of Three Polarizers". Journal of the Optical Society of America. 46 (7): 528–533. Bibcode:1956JOSA...46..528J. doi:10.1364/JOSA.46.000528.
- Jones, R. Clark (1958). "On the Point and Line Spread Functions of Photographic Images". Journal of the Optical Society of America. 48 (12): 934–937. Bibcode:1958JOSA...48..934J. doi:10.1364/JOSA.48.000934.
- Jones, R. Clark (1959). "Quantum Efficiency of Human Vision". Journal of the Optical Society of America. 49 (7): 645–653. Bibcode:1959JOSA...49..645J. doi:10.1364/JOSA.49.000645. PMID 13655161.
- Jones, R. Clark (1960). "Energy detectable by radiation detectors". Journal of the Optical Society of America. 50 (9): 883. Bibcode:1960JOSA...50..883J. doi:10.1364/JOSA.50.000883.
- Jones, R. Clark (1960). "Proposal of the Detectivity D^{**} for Detectors Limited by Radiation Noise". Journal of the Optical Society of America. 50 (11): 1058–1059. doi:10.1364/JOSA.50.001058.
- Jones, R. Clark (1960). "Information Capacity of Radiation Detectors". Journal of the Optical Society of America. 50 (12): 1166–1169. doi:10.1364/JOSA.50.001166.
- Jones, R. Clark (1961). "Information Capacity of Photographic Films". Journal of the Optical Society of America. 51 (11): 1159–1171. Bibcode:1961JOSA...51.1159J. doi:10.1364/JOSA.51.001159.
- Jones, R. Clark (1962). "Information Capacity of a Beam of Light". Journal of the Optical Society of America. 52 (5): 493–501. Bibcode:1962JOSA...52..493J. doi:10.1364/JOSA.52.000493.
- Jones, R. Clark (1962). "Immersed Radiation Detectors". Applied Optics. 1 (5): 607–613. Bibcode:1962ApOpt...1..607J. doi:10.1364/AO.1.000607.
- Jones, R. Clark (1962). "Ultimate Performance of Polarizers for Visible Light". Journal of the Optical Society of America. 52 (7): 747–750. Bibcode:1962JOSA...52..747J. doi:10.1364/JOSA.52.000747.
- Jones, R. Clark (1962). "Information Capacity of Radiation Detectors. II". Journal of the Optical Society of America. 52 (11): 1193–1200. Bibcode:1962JOSA...52.1193J. doi:10.1364/JOSA.52.001193.
- Jones, R. Clark (1963). "Terminology in Photometry and Radiometry". Journal of the Optical Society of America. 53 (11): 1314–5. doi:10.1364/JOSA.53.001314. PMID 14082111.
- Bird, George R.; Jones, R. Clark (1965). "Estimation of the Spectral Response Functions of the Human Cone Pigments". Journal of the Optical Society of America. 55 (12): 1686–1691. Bibcode:1965JOSA...55.1686B. doi:10.1364/JOSA.55.001686. PMID 5888122.
- Bird, George R.; Jones, R. Clark; Ames, Allan E. (1969). "The Efficiency of Radiation Detection by Photographic Films: State-of-the-Art and Methods of Improvement". Applied Optics. 8 (12): 2389–2405. Bibcode:1969ApOpt...8.2389B. doi:10.1364/AO.8.002389. PMID 20076051.
- Jones, R. Clark (1994). "Polarizers, Torpedoes, and Bombs". Optics and Photonics News. 5 (10): 18. Bibcode:1994OptPN...5...18J. doi:10.1364/OPN.5.10.000018.

== See also ==
- Sinusoidal plane-wave solutions of the electromagnetic wave equation Polarization of classical electromagnetic waves
- Polarization (waves)
