= Hans Mueller (physicist) =

Swiss physicist and professor (1900–1965)

Hans Mueller (October 27, 1900 – June 10, 1965) was a Swiss physicist and professor at the Massachusetts Institute of Technology (MIT). He created Mueller calculus.

Mueller was born October 27, 1900, in Amriswil, canton Thurgau, Switzerland. His father was Ernst Müller and mother Mathilde Meier. Hans attended school in Frauenfeld and proceeded in 1919 to Eidgenössische Technische Hochschule. He graduated with a teacher's diploma for science and mathematics in 1923. In graduate work his advisors were Peter Debye and Paul Scherrer.

In 1925, Mueller and Debye set out for a visit to MIT. Mueller was offered a position as instructor and in time became a popular professor. In 1928 he submitted his dissertation, On the Theory of Electric Charge and Coagulation of Colloids to ETH for the doctorate in physics. In 1935, he was promoted to associate professor. He was elected in 1936 a Fellow of the American Physical Society. As a Guggenheim Fellow, he was at the Cavendish Laboratory of Cambridge University in 1937–38. In 1942, he became a full professor.

In research, Mueller measured luminous intensity and studied polarization of light. He wrote several papers on Rochelle salts. The development of his matrix calculus was initially classified, but he made an exposition to the Optical Society of America in 1948. His student Nathan Grier Park III wrote a thesis, Matrix Optics expounding the method.

Hans Mueller died June 10, 1965, in Belmont, Massachusetts.
