= John Woollam (physicist) =

John A. Woollam
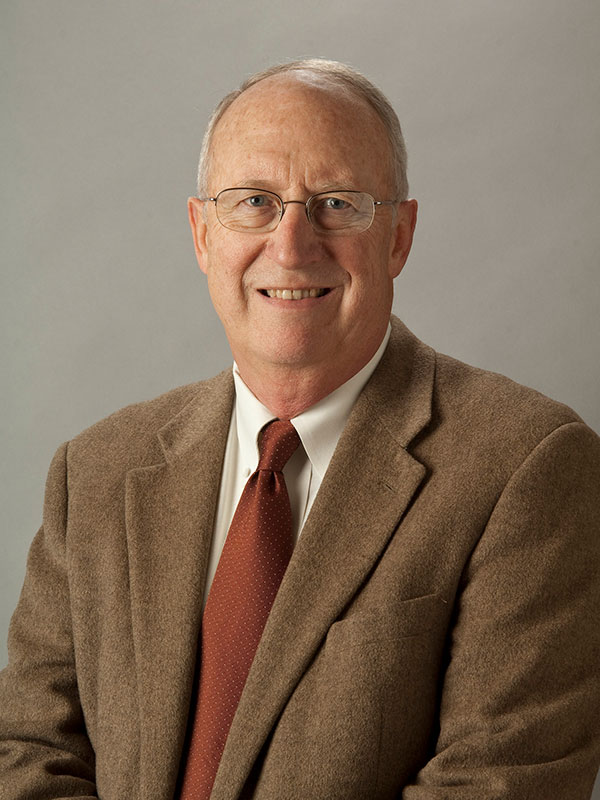
- Born: 10 August 1939 (age 87); Kalamazoo, MI, United States
- Education: Kenyon College; Michigan State University; Case Western Reserve University
- Scientific career
- Fields: Ellipsometry
- Workplaces: NASA; University of Nebraska–Lincoln; J.A. Woollam Company
- Thesis: Electron transport properties of metallic tin in high magnetic fields and at liquid helium temperatures (1967)

John Arthur Woollam (born 10 August 1939) is an American educator, research physicist, electrical engineer, and George Holmes Distinguished Professor at the University of Nebraska–Lincoln in Lincoln, Nebraska. He is also a successful entrepreneur who in 1987 founded the J.A. Woollam Company, an ellipsometry company based in Lincoln, Nebraska, and a world leader in the research, development, and commercialization of ellipsometry instruments. Woollam is also known as a philanthropist and nature conservationist.

== Early life and education ==
John Woollam was born in Kalamazoo, Michigan. His interest in physics, engineering, and business was stimulated by his father, Arthur E. Woollam, who ran a water pump company in Kalamazoo. As a teenager John was not interested very much in school classes, but he spent hours at his father's company studying and building pumps. This attitude changed when he attended Kenyon College in Gambier, Ohio, where he majored in physics. He earned his master's degree in 1963 and defended a Ph.D. in 1967 at the Michigan State University. For 13 years after that, he was employed by NASA to work in cryophysics, superconductivity, and propulsion systems. While working at NASA, he earned a master's degree in electrical engineering from the Case Institute of Technology at Case Western Reserve University in Cleveland, Ohio, in 1978.

== Career ==
In 1979, John Woollam became a professor at the University of Nebraska–Lincoln, taking over the laboratory and research group of retiring professor Nick Bashara, where he has researched the optical, electrical, and microstructural properties of solids and thin films as well as interfacial and environmental effects on materials. Trained as a solid-state experimental physicist, Woollam’s initial interest was in low-temperature physics, superconductors, and related materials; however, in the 1980s he began to study Raman spectroscopy and the optical characterization of surfaces and films of technological importance. More recently, he has focused primarily on studying the development and application of ellipsometry to a wide range of materials, industrial, and biological problems. Woollam and his group have contributed all over the world to the design, manufacture, and application of ellipsometric instruments at academic and corporate research/production facilities.

== J.A. Woollam Company ==
In 1987, John Woollam founded the J.A. Woollam Company, an ellipsometry company located in Lincoln, Nebraska. The J.A. Woollam Company was originally founded as a spin-off of Woollam's research at the University of Nebraska–Lincoln, but it has become a worldwide leader in the development and production of spectroscopic ellipsometers.

== Honors and awards ==
- Winner of the 2017 R.F. Bunshah Award, where he presented the honorary lecture at the 2017 International Conference on Metallurgical Coatings and Thin Films (ICMCTF).
- Fellow of the National Academy of Inventors (2014).
- Winner of the American Physical Society’s 2013 Industrial Applications of Physics prize for his sustained contributions in ellipsometry especially in extending the applications and in developing modern designs for these instruments.
- Fellow at the American Vacuum Society (2006)
- Honorary Doctorate (2004) Linkoping University, Sweden.
- Fellow at American Physical Society (1981) and a National Research Council Fellow (1967).
- Among Woollam’s other successes are his former students. He has mentored many of them from their early undergraduate days through post-graduate education. Many of his former students have remained in the Midwest to form the talent base at the core of the J.A. Woollam Company.
