= Polarimetry =

Measurement and interpretation of the polarization of transverse waves

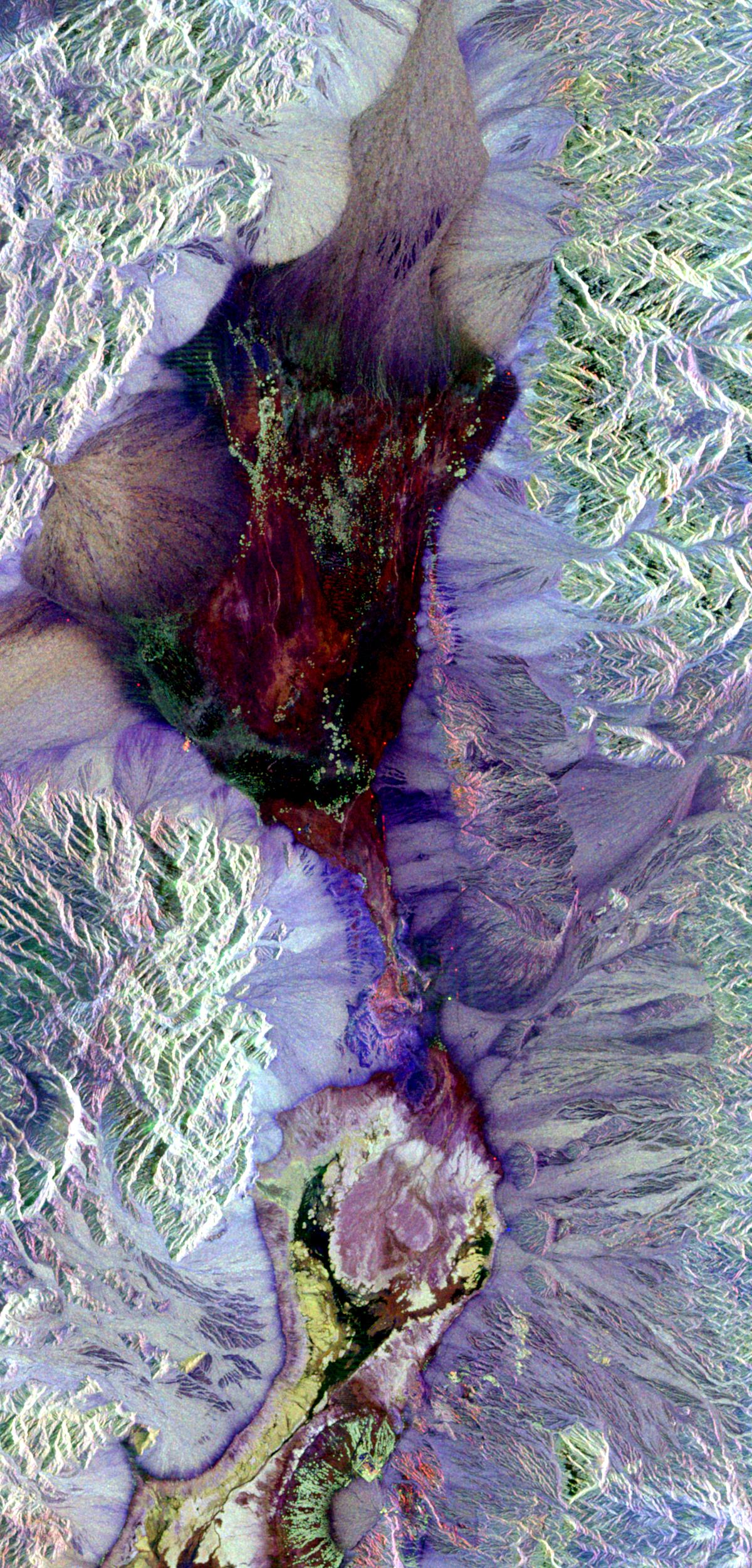
Synthetic aperture radar image of Death Valley colored using polarimetry.

Polarimetry is the measurement and interpretation of the polarization of transverse waves, most notably electromagnetic waves, such as radio or light waves. Typically polarimetry is done on electromagnetic waves that have traveled through or have been reflected, refracted or diffracted by some material in order to characterize that object.

== Applications ==
Polarimetry is used in biomedical imaging as well as remote sensing applications, such as planetary science, astronomy, and weather radar. Polarimetry of thin films and surfaces is commonly known as ellipsometry.

Polarimetry can also be included in computational analysis of waves. For example, radars often consider wave polarization in post-processing to improve the characterization of the targets. In this case, polarimetry can be used to estimate the fine texture of a material, help resolve the orientation of small structures in the target, and, when circularly-polarized antennas are used, resolve the number of bounces of the received signal (the chirality of circularly polarized waves alternates with each reflection).

=== Astronomy ===
Polarimetry is used in many areas of astronomy to study physical characteristics of sources including active galactic nuclei and blazars, exoplanets, gas and dust in the interstellar medium, supernovae, gamma-ray bursts, stellar rotation, stellar magnetic fields, debris disks, reflection in binary stars and the cosmic microwave background radiation. Astronomical polarimetry observations are carried out either as imaging polarimetry, where polarization is measured as a function of position in imaging data, or spectropolarimetry, where polarization is measured as a function of wavelength of light, or broad-band aperture polarimetry.

=== Biomedical ===
Mueller matrix polarimetry (MMP) has been investigated for biomedical imaging applications, where it is used to characterize tissue structure based on polarization-dependent light–matter interactions. Early studies demonstrated the feasibility of ex vivo cancer characterization using Mueller polarimetric imaging, for example in human colon tissue, where polarimetric contrast was shown to correlate with pathological changes.

=== Machine Learning ===
Later studies have combined Mueller matrix polarimetry with machine-learning methods for image segmentation and tumor identification in ex vivo human brain tissue. Studies report that both polarimetric features derived from Lu-Chipman decompositions and direct use of Mueller-matrix images as inputs to convolutional neural networks can discriminate between tumorous and healthy tissue, with potential relevance for intraoperative imaging.

When analyzing Mueller matrix polarimetric data using data-driven methods, conventional image augmentation techniques such as spatial rotations and reflections may violate physical polarization constraints. Physics-aware augmentation strategies have therefore been proposed that apply consistent transformations to both image geometry and Mueller-matrix elements. Such approaches preserve physical admissibility of the augmented data and have been shown to improve learning performance when training deep neural networks on polarimetric datasets limited in size.

=== Gemology ===
Gemologists use polariscopes to identify various properties of gems under examination. Proper examination may require the gem to be inspected in various positions and angles. A gemologist's polariscope is a vertically oriented device, usually with two polarizing lenses with one over the other with some space in between. A light source is built into the polariscope underneath the bottom polarizing lens and pointing upwards. A gemstone will be placed on top of the lower lens and may be properly examined by looking down at it through the top lens. To operate the polariscope, a gemologist may turn the polarizing lenses by hand to observe various characteristics about a gemstone. Polariscopes make use of their polarizing filters to reveal properties of a gem about how it affects light waves passing through it.

A polariscope may be first used to determine the optic character of a gem and whether it is singly refracting (isotropic), anomalously doubly refracting (isotropic), doubly refracting (anisotropic), or aggregate. If the stone is doubly refracting and is not an aggregate, the polariscope may be used to further determine the optic figure of the gemstone, or whether it is uniaxial or biaxial. This step may require use of a loupe, also known as a conoscope. Finally, a polariscope can be used to detect the pleochroism of a gemstone, although a dichroscope may be preferred for this purpose as it may show pleochroic colors side by side for easier identification.

=== Combined Imaging Modalities ===
In 2003, a visible-near IR (VNIR) Spectropolarimetric Imager with an acousto-optic tunable filter (AOTF) was reported. These hyperspectral and spectropolarimetric imager functioned in radiation regions spanning from ultraviolet (UV) to long-wave infrared (LWIR). In AOTFs a piezoelectric transducer converts a radio frequency (RF) signal into an ultrasonic wave. This wave then travels through a crystal attached to the transducer and upon entering an acoustic absorber is diffracted. The wavelength of the resulting light beams can be modified by altering the initial RF signal. VNIR and LWIR hyperspectral imaging consistently perform better as hyperspectral imagers. This technology was developed at the U.S. Army Research Laboratory.

The researchers reported visible near infrared system (VISNIR) data (.4-.9 micrometers) which required an RF signal below 1 W power. The reported experimental data indicates that polarimetric signatures are unique to manmade items and are not found in natural objects. The researchers state that a dual system, collecting both hyperspectral and spectropolarimetric information, is an advantage in image production for target tracking.

Polarimetric infrared imaging and detection can also highlight and distinguish different features in a scene and give unique signatures of different objects. A nano-plasmonic chirped metal structure for polarimetric detection in the mid-wave and long-wave infrared dual bands can give unique characteristics about the different detected materials, objects, and surfaces.

== Instrumentation ==
A polarimeter is the basic scientific instrument used to make these measurements, although this term is rarely used to describe a polarimetry process performed by a computer, such as is done in polarimetric synthetic aperture radar.

Polarimetry can be used to measure various optical properties of a material, including linear birefringence, circular birefringence (also known as optical rotation or optical rotary dispersion), linear dichroism, circular dichroism and scattering. To measure these various properties, there have been many designs of polarimeters, some archaic and some in current use. The most sensitive are based on interferometers, while more conventional polarimeters are based on arrangements of polarising filters, wave plates or other devices.

== Measuring optical rotation ==
Optically active samples, such as solutions of chiral molecules, often exhibit circular birefringence. Circular birefringence causes rotation of the polarization of plane polarized light as it passes through the sample.

In ordinary light, the vibrations occur in all planes perpendicular to the direction of propagation. When light passes through a Nicol prism its vibrations in all directions except the direction of axis of the prism are cut off. The light emerging from the prism is said to be plane polarised because its vibration is in one direction. If two Nicol prisms are placed with their polarization planes parallel to each other, then the light rays emerging out of the first prism will enter the second prism. As a result, no loss of light is observed. However, if the second prism is rotated by an angle of 90°, the light emerging from the first prism is stopped by the second prism and no light emerges. The first prism is usually called the polarizer and the second prism is called the analyser.

A simple polarimeter to measure this rotation consists of a long tube with flat glass ends, into which the sample is placed. At each end of the tube is a Nicol prism or other polarizer. Light is shone through the tube, and the prism at the other end, attached to an eye-piece, is rotated to arrive at the region of complete brightness or that of half-dark, half-bright or that of complete darkness. The angle of rotation is then read from a scale. The same phenomenon is observed after an angle of 180°. The specific rotation of the sample may then be calculated. Temperature can affect the rotation of light, which should be accounted for in the calculations.

$[\alpha]_\lambda^T = 100\alpha/l\rho\,\!$

where:

- [α]_{λ}^{T} is the specific rotation.
- T is the temperature.
- λ is the wavelength of light.
- α is the angle of rotation.
- l is the distance the light travels through the sample, the path length.
- $\rho$ is the mass concentration of solution.

== See also ==
- Ellipsometry
- History of crystallography before X-rays
