= Mueller calculus =

System for describing optical polarization

Mueller calculus is a matrix method for manipulating Stokes vectors, which represent the polarization of light. It was developed in 1943 by Hans Mueller. In this technique, the effect of a particular optical element is represented by a Mueller matrix—a 4×4 matrix that is an overlapping generalization of the Jones matrix.

== Introduction ==
Disregarding coherent wave superposition, any fully polarized, partially polarized, or unpolarized state of light can be represented by a Stokes vector ($\vec{S}$); and any optical element can be represented by a Mueller matrix (M).

If a beam of light is initially in the state $\vec{S}_i$ and then passes through an optical element M and comes out in a state $\vec{S}_o$, then it is written

$$\vec{S}_o = \mathrm{M} \vec{S}_i \ .$$

If a beam of light passes through optical element M_{1} followed by M_{2} then M_{3} it is written

$$\vec{S}_o = \mathrm{M}_3 \left(\mathrm{M}_2 \left(\mathrm{M}_1 \vec{S}_i\right) \right)$$

given that matrix multiplication is associative it can be written

$$\vec{S}_o = \mathrm{M}_3 \mathrm{M}_2 \mathrm{M}_1 \vec{S}_i \ .$$

Matrix multiplication is not commutative, so in general

$$\mathrm{M}_3 \mathrm{M}_2 \mathrm{M}_1 \vec{S}_i \ne \mathrm{M}_1 \mathrm{M}_2 \mathrm{M}_3 \vec{S}_i \ .$$

== Mueller vs. Jones calculi ==
With disregard for coherence, light which is unpolarized or partially polarized must be treated using the Mueller calculus, while fully polarized light can be treated with either the Mueller calculus or the simpler Jones calculus. Many problems involving coherent light (such as from a laser) must be treated with Jones calculus, however, because it works directly with the electric field of the light rather than with its intensity or power, and thereby retains information about the phase of the waves. More specifically, the following can be said about Mueller matrices and Jones matrices:

Stokes vectors and Mueller matrices operate on intensities and their differences, i.e. incoherent superpositions of light; they are not adequate to describe either interference or diffraction effects.

(...)

Any Jones matrix [J] can be transformed into the corresponding Mueller–Jones matrix, M, using the following relation:

$$\mathrm{M = A(J \otimes J^*)A^{-1}}$$,

where * indicates the complex conjugate [sic], [A is:]

$$\mathrm{A} =
\begin{pmatrix}
1 &  0 & 0 &  1 \\
1 &  0 & 0 & -1 \\
0 &  1 & 1 &  0 \\
0 & i & -i &  0 \\
\end{pmatrix}$$

and ⊗ is the tensor (Kronecker) product.

(...)

While the Jones matrix has eight independent parameters [two Cartesian or polar components for each of the four complex values in the 2-by-2 matrix], the absolute phase information is lost in the [equation above], leading to only seven independent matrix elements for a Mueller matrix derived from a Jones matrix.

== Mueller matrices ==
Below are listed the Mueller matrices for some ideal common optical elements:

General expression for reference frame rotation from the local frame to the laboratory frame:

$$\begin{pmatrix}
1 &                0 &               0 & 0 \\
0 &  \cos{(2\theta)} & \sin{(2\theta)} & 0 \\
0 & -\sin{(2\theta)} & \cos{(2\theta)} & 0 \\
0 &                0 &               0 & 1
\end{pmatrix}
\quad$$

where $\theta$ is the angle of rotation. For rotation from the laboratory frame to the local frame, the sign of the sine terms inverts.

Linear polarizer (horizontal transmission)
$${1 \over 2}
\begin{pmatrix}
1 & 1 & 0 & 0 \\
1 & 1 & 0 & 0 \\
0 & 0 & 0 & 0 \\
0 & 0 & 0 & 0
\end{pmatrix}$$

The Mueller matrices for other polarizer rotation angles can be generated by reference frame rotation.

Linear polarizer (vertical transmission)
$${1 \over 2}
\begin{pmatrix}
1 & -1 & 0 & 0 \\
-1 &  1 & 0 & 0 \\
0 &  0 & 0 & 0 \\
0 &  0 & 0 & 0
\end{pmatrix}$$

Linear polarizer (+45° transmission)
$${1 \over 2}
\begin{pmatrix}
1 & 0 & 1 & 0 \\
0 & 0 & 0 & 0 \\
1 & 0 & 1 & 0 \\
0 & 0 & 0 & 0
\end{pmatrix}$$

Linear polarizer (−45° transmission)
$${1 \over 2}
\begin{pmatrix}
1 & 0 & -1 & 0 \\
0 & 0 &  0 & 0 \\
-1 & 0 &  1 & 0 \\
0 & 0 &  0 & 0
\end{pmatrix}$$

General linear polarizer matrix
$${1 \over 2}
\begin{pmatrix}
1               & \cos{(2\theta)}             & \sin{(2\theta)}            & 0 \\
\cos{(2\theta)} & \cos^2(2\theta)             & \cos(2\theta)\sin(2\theta) & 0 \\
\sin{(2\theta)} & \cos(2\theta)\sin(2\theta)  & \sin^2(2\theta)            & 0 \\
0               &      0                      &         0                  & 0
\end{pmatrix}
\quad$$

where $\theta$ is the angle of rotation of the polarizer.

General linear retarder (wave plate calculations are made from this)
$$\begin{pmatrix}
1 &  0                                                       &
0                                                          & 0 \\
0 &  \cos^2(2\theta) + \sin^2(2\theta)\cos(\delta)           &
\cos(2\theta)\sin(2\theta)\left(1 - \cos(\delta)\right)    &  \sin(2\theta)\sin(\delta) \\
0 &  \cos(2\theta)\sin(2\theta)\left(1 - \cos(\delta)\right) &
\cos^2(2\theta)\cos(\delta) + \sin^2(2\theta)              & -\cos(2\theta)\sin(\delta) \\
0 & -\sin(2\theta)\sin(\delta)                               &
\cos(2\theta)\sin(\delta)                                  &  \cos(\delta)
\end{pmatrix}
\quad$$
where $\delta$ is the phase difference between the fast and slow axis and $\theta$ is the angle of the slow axis.
Quarter-wave plate (fast-axis vertical)
$$\begin{pmatrix}
1 & 0 & 0 &  0 \\
0 & 1 & 0 &  0 \\
0 & 0 & 0 & -1 \\
0 & 0 & 1 &  0
\end{pmatrix}$$
Quarter-wave plate (fast-axis horizontal)
$$\begin{pmatrix}
1 & 0 &  0 & 0 \\
0 & 1 &  0 & 0 \\
0 & 0 &  0 & 1 \\
0 & 0 & -1 & 0
\end{pmatrix}$$
Half-wave plate (fast-axis horizontal and vertical; also, ideal mirror)
$$\begin{pmatrix}
1 & 0 &  0 &  0 \\
0 & 1 &  0 &  0 \\
0 & 0 & -1 &  0 \\
0 & 0 &  0 & -1
\end{pmatrix}$$
Attenuating filter (25% transmission)
$${1 \over 4}
\begin{pmatrix}
1 & 0 & 0 & 0 \\
0 & 1 & 0 & 0 \\
0 & 0 & 1 & 0 \\
0 & 0 & 0 & 1
\end{pmatrix}
\quad$$

== Mueller tensors ==
The Mueller/Stokes architecture can also be used to describe non-linear optical processes, such as multi-photon excited fluorescence and second harmonic generation. The Mueller tensor can be connected back to the laboratory-frame Jones tensor by direct analogy with Mueller and Jones matrices.

$$\mathrm{M}^{(2)} = \mathrm{A}\left(\chi^{(2)*} \otimes \chi^{(2)}\right): \mathrm{A}^{-1}\mathrm{A}^{-1}$$,

where $M^{(2)}$ is the rank three Mueller tensor describing the Stokes vector produced by a pair of incident Stokes vectors, and $\chi^{(2)}$ is the 2×2×2 laboratory-frame Jones tensor.

== Applications ==
Mueller calculus finds application in polarimetry where it is used for biomedical tissue characterization, exploiting polarization-dependent light–matter interactions to reveal tissue structure and pathology. Studies have demonstrated characterization of human colon cancer using Mueller polarimetric imaging, where polarimetric contrast correlates with pathological changes.

Machine-learning methods have been combined with Mueller matrix measurements for tumor identification in brain tissue, including direct processing of Mueller matrix images with convolutional neural networks for tissue segmentation. To maintain physical consistency when augmenting limited polarimetric datasets for deep learning, physics-aware augmentation strategies apply transformations that preserve the mathematical constraints of Mueller matrices.

== See also ==
- Stokes parameters
- Jones calculus
- Polarization (waves)
