= Effective mass =

Effective mass may refer to:

- Effective mass (solid-state physics), a property of an excitation in a crystal analogous to the mass of a free particle
- Effective mass (spring–mass system)

== See also ==
- Reduced mass, used to simplify a two-body problem in terms of a one-body problem
