= Waveplate =

Optical polarization device

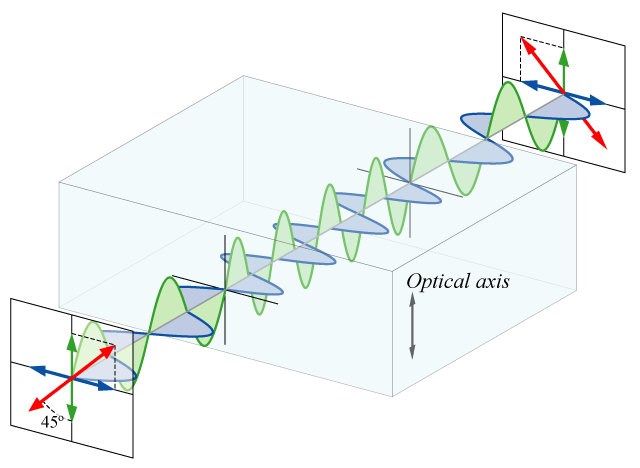
Electric field parallel to optic axis Electric field perpendicular to axis The combined field Linearly polarized light entering a half-wave plate can be resolved into two waves, parallel and perpendicular to the optic axis of the waveplate. In the plate, the parallel wave propagates slightly slower than the perpendicular one. At the far side of the plate, the parallel wave is exactly half of a wavelength delayed relative to the perpendicular wave, and the resulting combination is a mirror-image of the entry polarization state (relative to the optic axis).

A waveplate or retarder is an optical device that alters the polarization state of a light wave travelling through it. Two common types of waveplates are the half-wave plate, which rotates the polarization direction of linearly polarized light, and the quarter-wave plate, which converts between different elliptical polarizations (such as the special case of converting from linearly polarized light to circularly polarized light and vice versa.)

Waveplates are constructed out of a birefringent material (such as quartz or mica, or even plastic), for which the index of refraction is different for light that is linearly polarized along one or the other of two certain perpendicular crystal axes. The behavior of a waveplate (that is, whether it is a half-wave plate, a quarter-wave plate, etc.) depends on the thickness of the crystal, the wavelength of light, and the variation of the index of refraction. By appropriate choice of the relationship between these parameters, it is possible to introduce a controlled phase shift between the two polarization components of a light wave, thereby altering its polarization. With an engineered combination of two birefringent materials, an achromatic waveplate can be manufactured such that the spectral response of its phase retardance can be nearly flat.

A common use of waveplates—particularly the sensitive-tint (full-wave) and quarter-wave plates—is in optical mineralogy. Addition of plates between the polarizers of a petrographic microscope makes the optical identification of minerals in thin sections of rocks easier, in particular by allowing deduction of the shape and orientation of the optical indicatrices within the visible crystal sections. This alignment can allow discrimination between minerals which otherwise appear very similar in plane polarized and cross polarized light.

== Principles of operation ==
A wave in a uniaxial crystal will separate in two components, one parallel and one perpendicular to the optic axis, that will accumulate phase at different rates. This can be used to manipulate the polarization state of the wave.

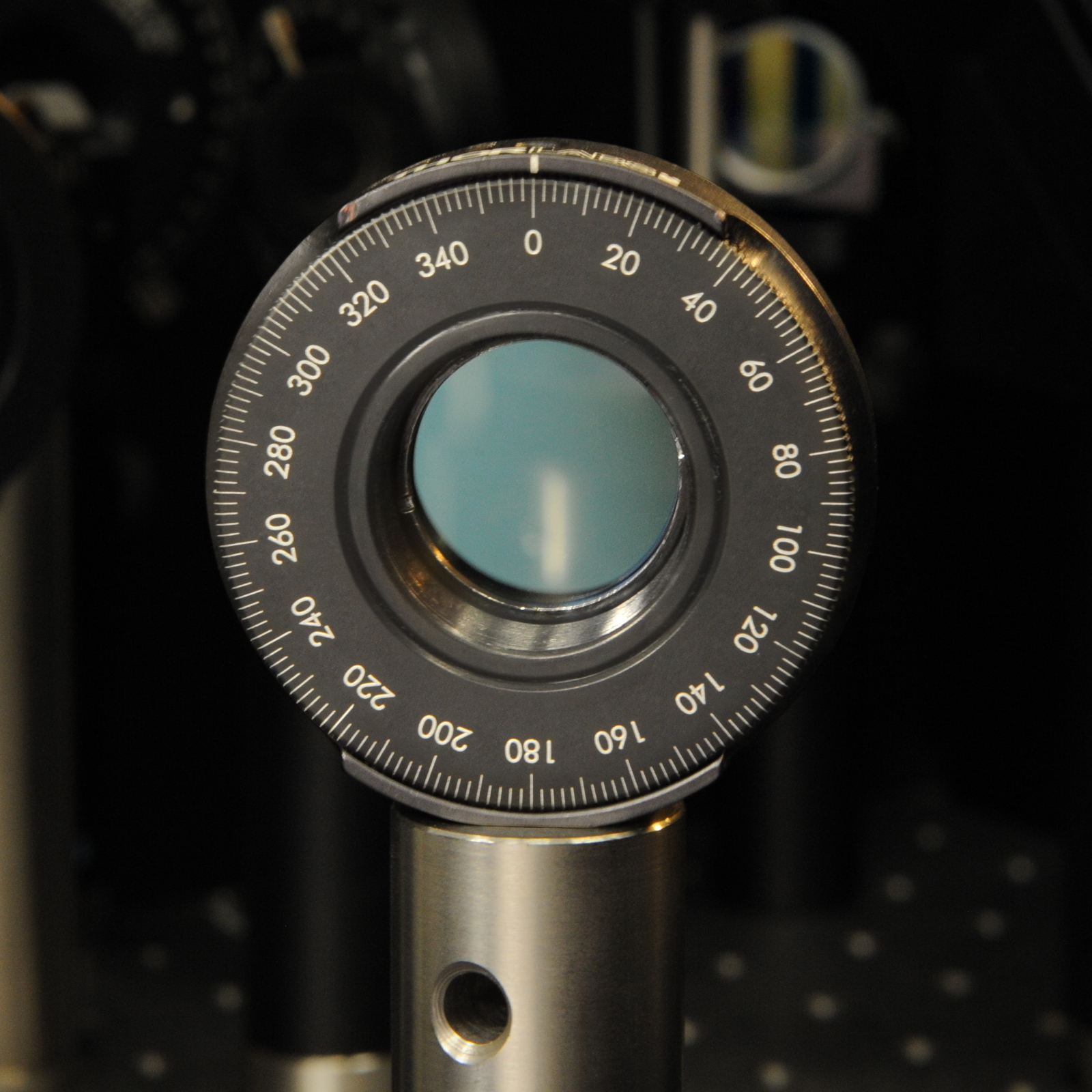
A waveplate mounted in a rotary mount

A waveplate works by shifting the phase between two perpendicular polarization components of the light wave. A typical waveplate is simply a birefringent crystal with a carefully chosen orientation and thickness. The crystal is cut into a plate, with the orientation of the cut chosen so that the optic axis of the crystal is parallel to the surfaces of the plate. This results in two axes in the plane of the cut: the ordinary axis, with index of refraction $n_\mathrm{o}$, and the extraordinary axis, with index of refraction $n_\mathrm{e}$. The ordinary axis is perpendicular to the optic axis. The extraordinary axis is parallel to the optic axis. For a light wave normally incident upon the plate, the polarization component along the ordinary axis travels through the crystal with a speed $\textstyle v_\mathrm{o} = {c\over n_\mathrm{o} }$, while the polarization component along the extraordinary axis travels with a speed $\textstyle v_\mathrm{e} = {c\over n_\mathrm{e} }$. This leads to a phase difference between the two components as they exit the crystal. When $n_\mathrm{e} < n_\mathrm{o}$, as in calcite, the extraordinary axis is called the fast axis and the ordinary axis is called the slow axis. For $n_\mathrm{e} > n_\mathrm{o}$ the situation is reversed.

Depending on the thickness of the crystal, light with polarization components along both axes will emerge in a different polarization state. The waveplate is characterized by the amount of relative phase, $\Gamma$, that it imparts on the two components, which is related to the birefringence $\Delta n$ and the thickness $L$ of the crystal by the formula
$$\Gamma = \frac{2 \pi\, \Delta n\, L}{\lambda_0},$$
where $\lambda_0$ is the vacuum wavelength of the light.

Waveplates in general, as well as polarizers, can be described using the Jones matrix formalism, which uses a vector to represent the polarization state of light and a matrix to represent the linear transformation of a waveplate or polarizer.

Although the birefringence $\Delta n$ may vary slightly due to dispersion, this is negligible compared to the variation in phase difference according to the wavelength of the light due to the fixed path difference ($\lambda_0$ in the denominator in the above equation). Waveplates are thus manufactured to work for a particular range of wavelengths. The phase variation can be minimized by stacking two waveplates that differ by a tiny amount in thickness back-to-back, with the slow axis of one along the fast axis of the other. With this configuration, the relative phase imparted can be, for the case of a quarter-wave plate, one-fourth a wavelength rather than three-fourths or one-fourth plus an integer. This is called a zero-order waveplate.

For a single waveplate changing the wavelength of the light introduces a linear error in the phase. Tilt of the waveplate enters via a factor of $\textstyle {1\over\cos{\theta}}$ (i.e., $\sec{\theta}$) (where $\theta$ is the angle of tilt) into the path length and thus only quadratically into the phase. For the extraordinary polarization the tilt also changes the refractive index to the ordinary via a factor of $\cos{\theta}$, so combined with the path length, the phase shift for the extraordinary light due to tilt is zero.

A polarization-independent phase shift of zero order needs a plate with thickness of one wavelength. For calcite the refractive index changes in the first decimal place, so that a true zero order plate is ten times as thick as one wavelength. For quartz and magnesium fluoride the refractive index changes in the second decimal place and true zero order plates are common for wavelengths above 1 μm.

== Plate types ==
=== Half-wave plate ===
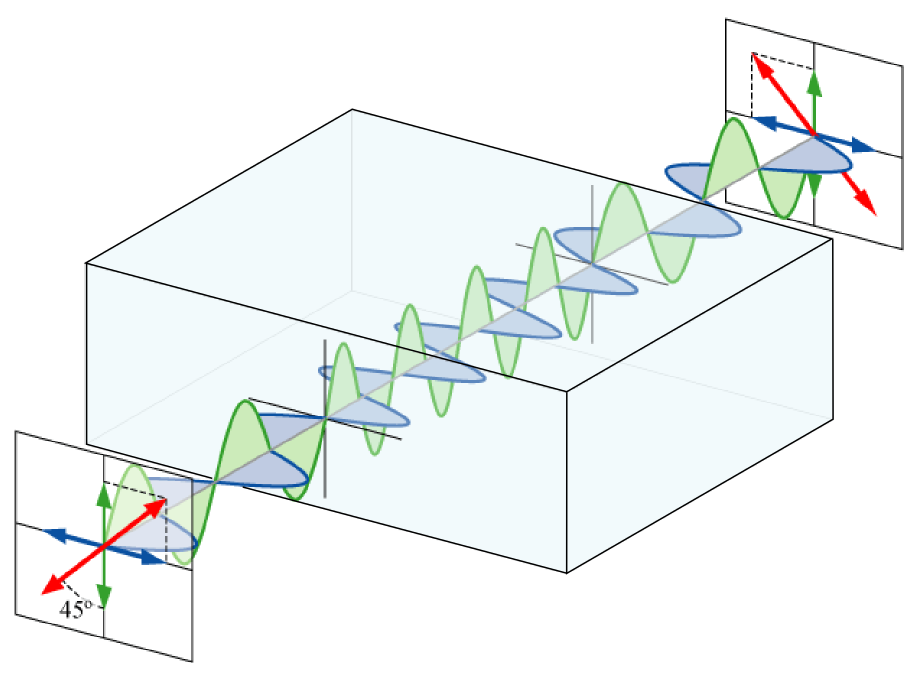
A wave passing through a half-wave plate

For a half-wave plate, the relationship between $L$, $\Delta n$, and $\lambda_0$ is chosen so that the phase shift between polarization components is $\Gamma = \pi$. Now suppose a linearly polarized wave with polarization vector $\mathbf{\hat p}$ is incident on the crystal. Let $\theta$ denote the angle between $\mathbf{\hat p}$ and $\mathbf{\hat f}$, where $\mathbf{\hat f}$ is the vector along the waveplate's fast axis. Let z denote the propagation axis of the wave. The electric field of the incident wave is
$$\mathbf{E}e^{i(kz-\omega t)} = E\mathbf{\hat p}e^{i(kz-\omega t)} = E (\mathbf{\hat f}\cos\theta + \mathbf{\hat s}\sin\theta) e^{i(kz-\omega t)},$$
where $\mathbf{\hat s}$ lies along the waveplate's slow axis. The effect of the half-wave plate is to introduce a phase shift term $e^{i\Gamma} =$ $e^{i\pi} = -1$ between the $\mathbf{\hat f}$ and $\mathbf{\hat s}$ -aligned components of the wave, so that upon exiting the crystal the wave is now given by
$$E (\mathbf{\hat f}\cos\theta - \mathbf{\hat s}\sin\theta)e^{i(kz-\omega t)} = E [ \mathbf{\hat f}\cos(-\theta) + \mathbf{\hat s}\sin(-\theta)] e^{i(kz-\omega t)}.$$
If $\mathbf{\hat p}'$ denotes the polarization vector of the wave exiting the waveplate, then this expression shows that the angle between $\mathbf{\hat p}'$ and $\mathbf{\hat f}$ is $-\theta$. Evidently, the effect of the half-wave plate is to mirror the wave's polarization vector through the plane formed by the vectors $\mathbf{\hat f}$ and $\mathbf{\hat z}$. For linearly polarized light, this is equivalent to saying that the effect of the half-wave plate is to rotate the polarization vector through an angle $2\theta$; however, for elliptically polarized light the half-wave plate also has the effect of inverting the light's handedness.

=== Quarter-wave plate ===
Two waves differing by a quarter-phase shift for one axis

Creating circular polarization using a quarter-wave plate (fast axis is vertical in this wave plate) and a polarizing filter

For a quarter-wave plate, the relationship between $L$, $\Delta n$, and $\lambda_0$ is chosen so that the phase shift between polarization components is $\textstyle \Gamma = {\pi\over2}$. Now suppose a linearly polarized wave is incident on the crystal. This wave can be written as
$$(E_\mathrm{f} \mathbf{\hat f} + E_\mathrm{s} \mathbf{\hat s})e^{i(kz-\omega t)},$$
where

- the $\mathrm f$ and $\mathrm s$ axes are the quarter-wave plate's fast and slow axes, respectively;
- the wave propagates along the $z$ axis; and
- $E_\mathrm{f}$ and $E_\mathrm{s}$ are real.

The effect of the quarter-wave plate is to introduce a phase shift term $e^{i\Gamma} =$ $e^{i\pi/2} = i$ between the $\mathrm f$ and $\mathrm s$ components of the wave, so that upon exiting the crystal the wave is now given by
$$(E_\mathrm{f} \mathbf{\hat f} + i E_\mathrm{s} \mathbf{\hat s})e^{i(kz-\omega t)}.$$
The wave is now elliptically polarized.

If the axis of polarization of the incident wave is chosen so that it makes a 45° angle with the fast and slow axes of the waveplate, then $E_\mathrm{f} = E_\mathrm{s} \equiv E$, and the resulting wave upon exiting the waveplate is
$$E(\mathbf{\hat f}+i\mathbf{\hat s})e^{i(kz-\omega t)},$$
and the wave is circularly polarized.

The output of a quarter-wave plate depends on the polarization of the input. Suppose polarization axes $x$ and $y$ parallel with the slow axis and the fast axis of the quarter-wave plate:

Composition of two linearly polarized waves, phase shifted by π/2

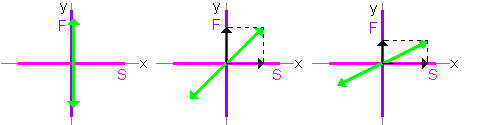

The polarization of the incoming photon (or beam) can be resolved as two polarizations on the $x$ and $y$ axis. If the input polarization is parallel to the fast or slow axis, then there is no polarization of the other axis, so the output polarization is the same as the input (only the phase more or less delayed). If the input polarization is 45° relative to the fast and slow axis, then the polarizations on those axes are equal, and the phase of the output of the slow axis will be delayed 90° with respect to the output of the fast axis. As a result, as shown above, the output is circularly polarized. With other angles than 0° or 45°, the values in fast and slow axes in input will differ and their resultant output will describe an ellipse.

=== Full-wave, or sensitive-tint plate ===
A full-wave plate introduces a phase difference of exactly one wavelength between the two polarization directions, for one wavelength of light. In optical mineralogy, it is common to use a full-wave plate designed for green light (a wavelength near 540 nm). Linearly polarized white light which passes through the plate becomes elliptically polarized, except for that green light wavelength, which will remain linear. If a linear polarizer oriented perpendicular to the original polarization is added, this green wavelength is fully extinguished but elements of the other colors remain. This means that under these conditions the plate will appear an intense shade of red-violet, sometimes known as "sensitive tint". This gives rise to this plate's alternative names, the sensitive-tint plate or (less commonly) red-tint plate. These plates are widely used in mineralogy to aid in identification of minerals in thin sections of rocks.

=== Multiple-order vs. zero-order waveplates ===
A multiple-order waveplate is made from a single birefringent crystal that produces an integer multiple of the rated retardance (for example, a multiple-order half-wave plate may have an absolute retardance of $\textstyle 37{\lambda\over2}$. By contrast, a zero-order waveplate produces exactly the specified retardance. This can be accomplished by combining two multiple-order wave plates such that the difference in their retardances yields the net (true) retardance of the waveplate. Zero-order waveplates are less sensitive to temperature and wavelength shifts, but are more expensive than multiple-order ones.

Stacking a series of different-order waveplates with polarization filters between them yields a Lyot filter. Either the filters can be rotated, or the waveplates can be replaced with liquid crystal layers, to obtain a widely tunable pass band in optical transmission spectrum.

== Use in mineralogy and optical petrology ==
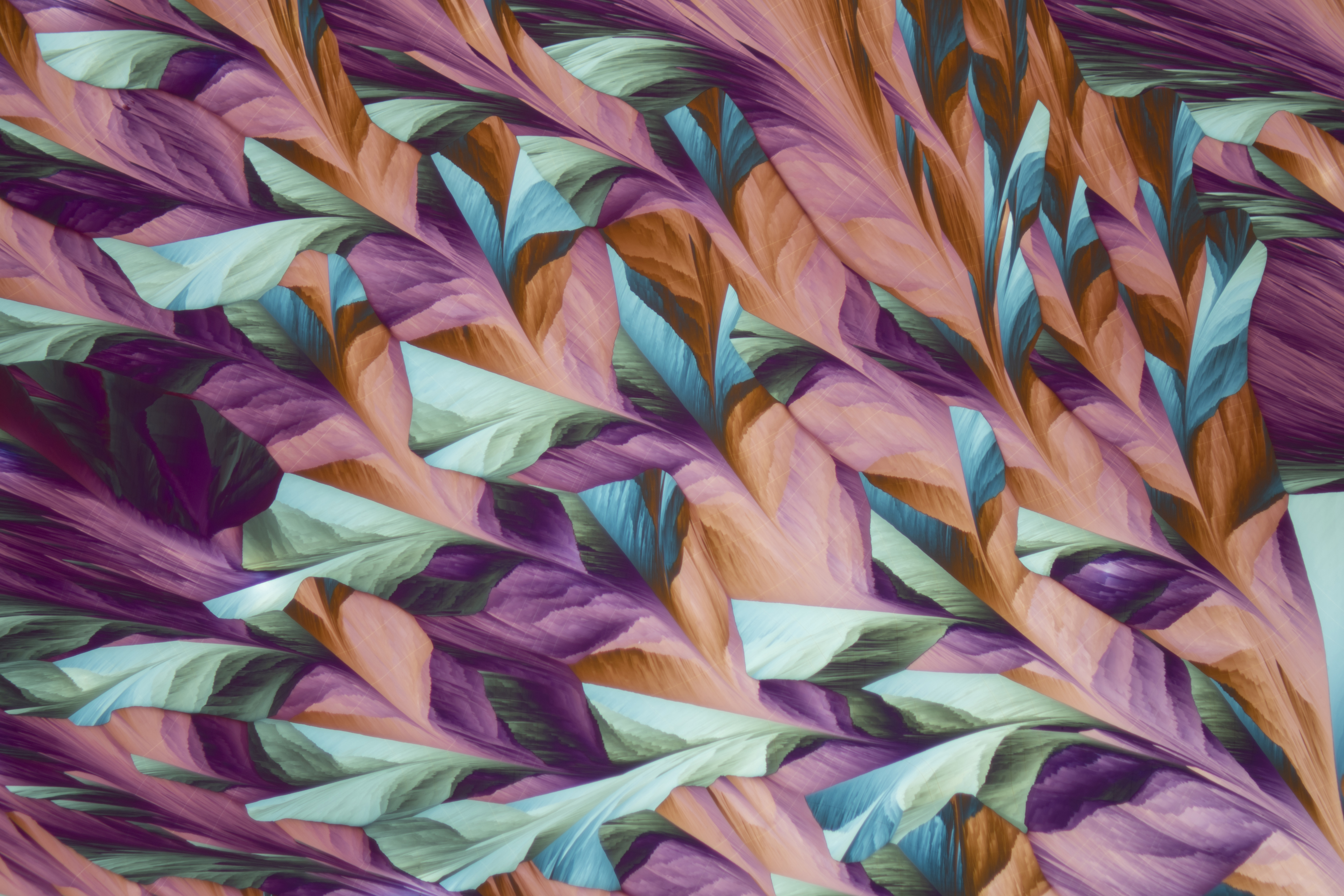
Thin crystalline film of caesium chloride photographed using a petrographic microscope

The sensitive-tint (full-wave) and quarter-wave plates are widely used in the field of optical mineralogy. Addition of plates between the polarizers of a petrographic microscope makes easier the optical identification of minerals in thin sections of rocks, in particular by allowing deduction of the shape and orientation of the optical indicatrices within the visible crystal sections.

In practical terms, the plate is inserted between the perpendicular polarizers at an angle of 45°. This allows two different procedures to be carried out to investigate the mineral under the crosshairs of the microscope. Firstly, in ordinary cross polarized light, the plate can be used to distinguish the orientation of the optical indicatrix relative to crystal elongation – that is, whether the mineral is "length slow" or "length fast" – based on whether the visible interference colors increase or decrease by one order when the plate is added. Secondly, a slightly more complex procedure allows for a tint plate to be used in conjunction with interference figure techniques to allow measurement of the optic angle of the mineral. The optic angle (often notated as "2V") can both be diagnostic of mineral type, as well as in some cases revealing information about the variation of chemical composition within a single mineral type.

== See also ==
- Crystal optics
- Fresnel rhomb
- Photoelastic modulator
- Polarization rotator
- Q-plate
- Spatial light modulator
- Zone plate
