= Poincaré sphere =

Poincaré sphere may refer to:

- Poincaré sphere (optics), a graphical tool for visualizing different types of polarized light
  - Bloch sphere, a related tool for representing states of a two-level quantum mechanical system
- Poincaré homology sphere, in mathematics, an example of a homology sphere
