= Radial polarization =

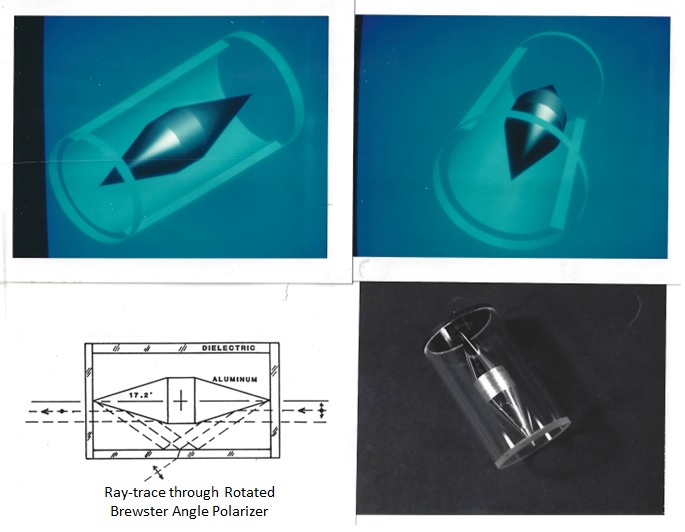
Rotated Brewster Angle Polarizer for producing radial polarization. Clockwise: two CAD views, "as-built" unit, and ray-trace through unit.

A beam of light has radial polarization if at every position in the beam the polarization (electric field) vector points towards the center of the beam. In practice, an array of waveplates may be used to provide an approximation to a radially polarized beam. In this case the beam is divided into segments (eight, for example), and the average polarization vector of each segment is directed towards the beam centre.

Azimuthal (upper) and Radial (lower) polarised laser beams

Radial polarization can be produced in a variety of ways. It is possible to use so-called q-devices to convert the polarization of a beam to a radial state. The simplest example of such devices is inhomogeneous anisotropic birefringent waveplate that performs transversally inhomogeneous polarization transformations of a wave with a uniform initial state of polarization. The other examples are liquid crystal, and metasurface q-plates. In addition, a radially polarized beam can be produced by a laser, or any collimated light source, in which the Brewster window is replaced by a cone at Brewster's angle. Called a "Rotated Brewster Angle Polarizer," the latter was first proposed and put into practice (1986) to produce a radially-polarized annular pupil by John M. Guerra at Polaroid Corporation (Polaroid Optical Engineering Dept., Cambridge, Massachusetts) to achieve super-resolution in their Photon Tunneling Microscope. A metal bi-cone, formed by diamond-turning, was suspended inside a glass cylinder, mounted at its endpoints to the center of two transparent windows capping the cylinder. Collimated light entering this device underwent two air-metal reflections at the bi-cone and one air-glass reflection at the Brewster angle inside the glass cylinder, so as to exit as radially-polarized light. A similar device was later proposed again by Kozawa.

A related concept is azimuthal polarization, in which the polarization vector is tangential to the beam. If a laser is focused along the optic axis of a birefringent material, the radial and azimuthal polarizations focus at different planes. A spatial filter can be used to select the polarization of interest. Beams with radial and azimuthal polarization are included in the class of cylindrical vector beams.

A radially polarized beam can be used to produce a smaller focused spot than a more conventional linearly or circularly polarized beam, and has uses in optical trapping.

It has been shown that a radially polarized beam can be used to increase the information capacity of free space optical communication via mode division multiplexing, and radial polarization can "self-heal" when obstructed.

At extreme intensities, radially-polarized laser pulses with relativistic intensities and few-cycle pulse durations have been demonstrated via spectral broadening, polarization mode conversion and appropriate dispersion compensation. The relativistic longitudinal electric field component has been proposed as a driver for particle acceleration in free space and demonstrated in proof-of-concept experiments.
