= Stokes operators =

The Stokes operators are the quantum mechanical operators corresponding to the classical Stokes parameters. These matrix operators are identical to the Pauli matrices.
