= Rayleigh sky model =

Polarization pattern of the daytime sky

The Rayleigh sky model describes the observed polarization pattern of the daytime sky. Within the atmosphere, Rayleigh scattering of light by air molecules, water, dust, and aerosols causes the sky's light to have a defined polarization pattern. The same elastic scattering processes cause the sky to be blue. The polarization is characterized at each wavelength by its degree of polarization, and orientation (the e-vector angle, or scattering angle).

The polarization pattern of the sky is dependent on the celestial position of the Sun. While all scattered light is polarized to some extent, light is highly polarized at a scattering angle of 90° from the light source. In most cases the light source is the Sun, but the Moon creates the same pattern as well. The degree of polarization first increases with increasing distance from the Sun, and then decreases away from the Sun. Thus, the maximum degree of polarization occurs in a circular band 90° from the Sun. In this band, degrees of polarization near 80% are typically reached.

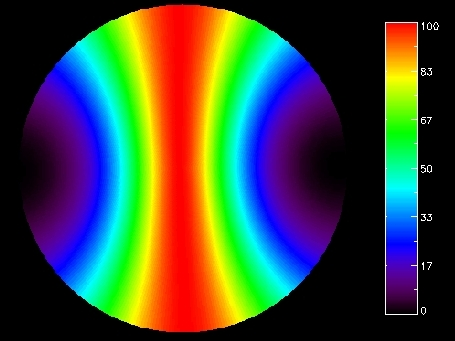
Degree of polarization in the Rayleigh sky at sunset or sunrise. The zenith is at the center of the graph.

When the Sun is located at the zenith, the band of maximal polarization wraps around the horizon. Light from the sky is polarized horizontally along the horizon. During twilight at either the vernal or autumnal equinox, the band of maximal polarization is defined by the north-zenith-south plane, or meridian. In particular, the polarization is vertical at the horizon in the north and south, where the meridian meets the horizon. The polarization at twilight at an equinox is represented by the figure to the right. The red band represents the circle in the north-zenith-south plane where the sky is highly polarized. The cardinal directions (N, E, S, W) are shown at 12-o'clock, 9 o'clock, 6 o'clock, and 3 o'clock (counter-clockwise around the celestial sphere, since the observer is looking up at the sky).

Note that because the polarization pattern is dependent on the Sun, it changes not only throughout the day but throughout the year. When the sun sets toward the South, in the northern hemisphere's winter, the North-Zenith-South plane is offset, with "effective" North actually located somewhat toward the West. Thus if the sun sets at an azimuth of 255° (15° South of West) the polarization pattern will be at its maximum along the horizon at an azimuth of 345° (15° West of North) and 165° (15° East of South).

During a single day, the pattern rotates with the changing position of the sun. At twilight, it typically appears about 45 minutes before local sunrise and disappears 45 minutes after local sunset. Once established it is very stable, showing change only in its rotation. It can easily be seen on any given day using polarized sunglasses.

Many animals use the polarization patterns of the sky at twilight and throughout the day as a navigation tool. Because it is determined purely by the position of the Sun, it is easily used as a compass for animal orientation. By orienting themselves with respect to the polarization patterns, animals can locate the Sun and thus determine the cardinal directions.

== Theory ==
=== Geometry ===
The geometry representing the Rayleigh sky

The geometry for the sky polarization can be represented by a celestial triangle based on the Sun, zenith, and observed pointing (or the point of scattering). In the model, γ is the angular distance between the observed pointing and the Sun, Θ_{s} is the solar zenith distance (90° – solar altitude), Θ is the angular distance between the observed pointing and the zenith (90° – observed altitude), Φ is the angle between the zenith direction and the solar direction at the observed pointing, and ψ is the angle between the solar direction and the observed pointing at the zenith.

Thus, the spherical triangle is defined not only by the three points located at the Sun, zenith, and observed point but by both the three interior angles as well as the three angular distances. In an altitude-azimuth grid the angular distance between the observed pointing and the Sun and the angular distance between the observed pointing and the zenith change while the angular distance between the Sun and the zenith remains constant at one point in time.

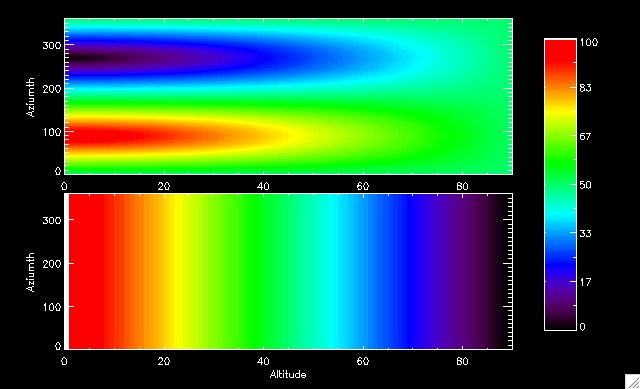
The angular distances between the observed pointing and the Sun when the sun is setting to the west (top plot) and between the observed pointing and the zenith (bottom plot)

The figure to the left shows the two changing angular distances as mapped onto an altitude-azimuth grid (with altitude located on the x-axis and azimuth located on the y-axis). The top plot represents the changing angular distance between the observed pointing and the Sun, which is opposite to the interior angle located at the zenith (or the scattering angle). When the Sun is located at the zenith this distance is greatest along the horizon at every cardinal direction. It then decreases with rising altitude moving closer toward the zenith. At twilight the sun is setting in the west. Hence the distance is greatest when looking directly away from the Sun along the horizon in the east, and lowest along the horizon in the west.

The bottom plot in the figure to the left represents the angular distance from the observed pointing to the zenith, which is opposite to the interior angle located at the Sun. Unlike the distance between the observed pointing and the Sun, this is independent of azimuth, i.e. cardinal direction. It is simply greatest along the horizon at low altitudes and decreases linearly with rising altitude.

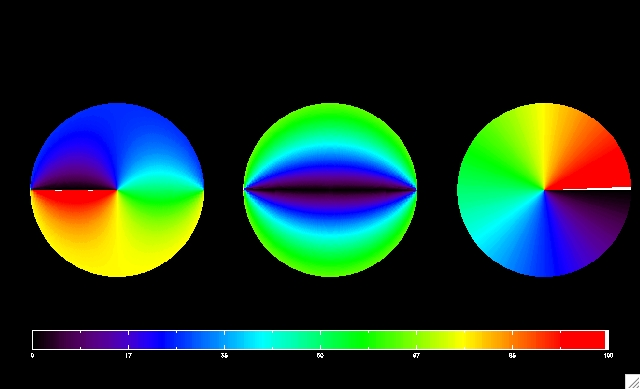
The three interior angles of the celestial triangle.

The figure to the right represents the three angular distances. The left one represents the angle at the observed pointing between the zenith direction and the solar direction. This is thus heavily dependent on the changing solar direction as the Sun is perceived as moving across the sky. The middle one represents the angle at the Sun between the zenith direction and the pointing. Again this is heavily dependent on the changing pointing. This is symmetrical between the North and South hemispheres. The right one represents the angle at the zenith between the solar direction and the pointing. It thus rotates around the celestial sphere.

=== Degree of polarization ===
The Rayleigh sky model predicts the degree of sky polarization as:

$$\delta = \frac{ \delta_{max} \sin^2 \gamma }{ 1 + \cos^2 \gamma}$$

The polarization along the horizon at sunset or sunrise.

As a simple example one can map the degree of polarization on the horizon. As seen in the figure to the right it is high in the North (0° and 360°) and the South (180°). It then resembles a cosine function and decreases toward the East and West reaching zero at these cardinal directions.

The degree of polarization is easily understood when mapped onto an altitude-azimuth grid as shown below. As the sun sets due West, the maximum degree of polarization can be seen in the North-Zenith-South plane. Along the horizon, at an altitude of 0° it is highest in the North and South, and lowest in the East and West. Then as altitude increases approaching the zenith (or the plane of maximum polarization) the polarization remains high in the North and South and increases until it is again maximum at 90° in the East and West, where it is then at the zenith and within the plane of polarization.

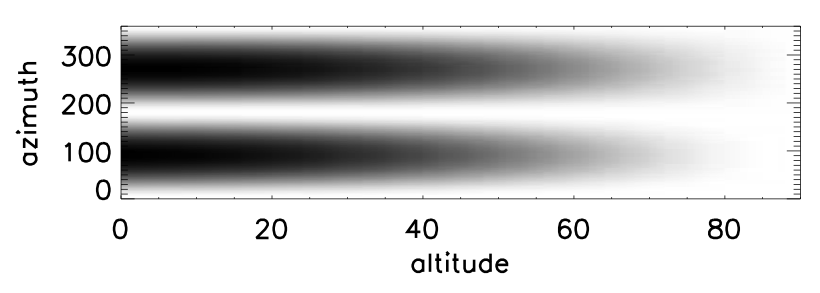
The degree of sky polarization as mapped onto the celestial sphere at sunset or sunrise.

The degree of polarization. Red is high (approximately 80%) and black is low (0%).

Click on the adjacent image to view an animation that represents the degree of polarization as shown on the celestial sphere. Black represents areas where the degree of polarization is zero, whereas red represents areas where the degree of polarization is much larger. It is approximately 80%, which is a realistic maximum for the clear Rayleigh sky during day time. The video thus begins when the sun is slightly above the horizon and at an azimuth of 120°. The sky is highly polarized in the effective North-Zenith-South plane. This is slightly offset because the sun's azimuth is not due East. The sun moves across the sky with clear circular polarization patterns surrounding it. When the Sun is located at the zenith the polarization is independent of azimuth and decreases with rising altitude (as it approaches the sun). The pattern then continues as the sun approaches the horizon once again for sunset. The video ends with the sun below the horizon.

=== Polarization angle ===
The polarization angle. Red is high (approximately 90°) and black is low (-90°).

The scattering plane is the plane through the Sun, the observer, and the point observed (or the scattering point). The scattering angle, γ, is the angular distance between the Sun and the observed point. The equation for the scattering angle is derived from the law of cosines to the spherical triangle (refer to the figure above in the geometry section). It is given by:

${\cos \gamma = \sin \theta_{s}\sin \theta \cos{ (\psi_s-\psi)} + \cos \theta_{s}\cos \theta}$

In the above equation, ψ_{s} and θ_{s} are respectively the azimuth and zenith angle of the Sun, and ψ and θ are respectively the azimuth and zenith angle of the observed point.

This equation breaks down at the zenith where the angular distance between the observed pointing and the zenith, θ_{s} is 0. Here the orientation of polarization is defined as the difference in azimuth between the observed pointing and the solar azimuth.

The angle of polarization (or polarization angle) is defined as the relative angle between a vector tangent to the meridian of the observed point, and an angle perpendicular to the scattering plane.

The polarization angles show a regular shift in polarization angle with azimuth. For example, when the sun is setting in the West the polarization angles proceed around the horizon. At this time the degree of polarization is constant in circular bands centered around the Sun. Thus the degree of polarization as well as its corresponding angle clearly shifts around the horizon. When the Sun is located at the zenith the horizon represents a constant degree of polarization. The corresponding polarization angle still shifts with different directions toward the zenith from different points.

The video to the right represents the polarization angle mapped onto the celestial sphere. It begins with the Sun located in a similar fashion. The angle is zero along the line from the Sun to the zenith and increases clockwise toward the East as the observed point moves clockwise toward the East. Once the sun rises in the East the angle acts in a similar fashion until the sun begins to move across the sky. As the sun moves across the sky the angle is both zero and high along the line defined by the sun, the zenith, and the anti-sun. It is lower South of this line and higher North of this line. When the Sun is at the zenith, the angle is either fully positive or 0. These two values rotate toward the west. The video then repeats a similar fashion when the sun sets in the West.

=== Q and U Stokes parameters ===
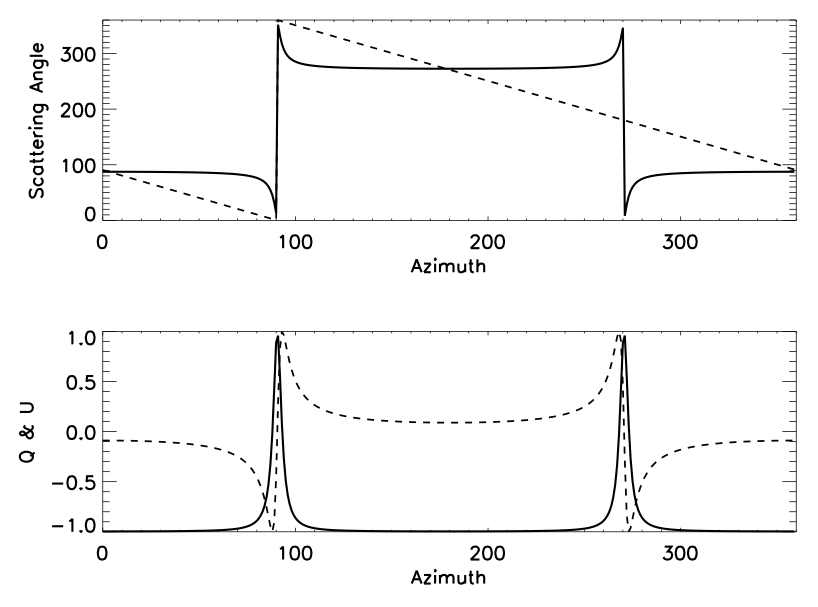
The q and u input.

The angle of polarization can be unwrapped into the Q and U Stokes parameters. Q and U are defined as the linearly polarized intensities along the position angles 0° and 45° respectively; -Q and -U are along the position angles 90° and −45°.

If the sun is located on the horizon due west, the degree of polarization is then along the North-Zenith-South plane. If the observer faces West and looks at the zenith, the polarization is horizontal with the observer. At this direction Q is 1 and U is 0. If the observer is still facing West but looking North instead then the polarization is vertical with him. Thus Q is −1 and U remains 0. Along the horizon U is always 0. Q is always −1 except in the East and West.

The scattering angle (the angle at the zenith between the solar direction and the observer direction) along the horizon is a circle. From the East through the West it is 180° and from the West through the East it is 90° at twilight. When the sun is setting in the West, the angle is then 180° East through West, and only 90° West through East. The scattering angle at an altitude of 45° is consistent.

The input stokes parameters q and u are then with respect to North but in the altitude-azimuth frame. We can easily unwrap q assuming it is in the +altitude direction. From the basic definition we know that +Q is an angle of 0° and -Q is an angle of 90°. Therefore, Q is calculated from a sine function. Similarly U is calculated from a cosine function. The angle of polarization is always perpendicular to the scattering plane. Therefore, 90° is added to both scattering angles in order to find the polarization angles. From this the Q and U Stokes parameters are determined:

$$Q_{in}=\sin(2\theta+90)$$

and

$$U_{in}=\cos(2\theta+90)$$

The scattering angle, derived from the law of cosines is with respect to the Sun. The polarization angle is the angle with respect to the zenith, or positive altitude. There is a line of symmetry defined by the Sun and the zenith. It is drawn from the Sun through the zenith to the other side of the celestial sphere where the "anti-sun" would be. This is also the effective East-Zenith-West plane.

The q input. Red is high (approximately 80%) and black is low (0%). (Click for animation)

The u input. Red is high (approximately 80%) and black is low (0%). (Click for animation)

The first image to the right represents the q input mapped onto the celestial sphere. It is symmetric about the line defined by the sun-zenith-anti-sun. At twilight, in the North-Zenith-South plane it is negative because it is vertical with the degree of polarization. It is horizontal, or positive in the East-Zenith-West plane. In other words, it is positive in the ±altitude direction and negative in the ±azimuth direction. As the sun moves across the sky the q input remains high along the sun-zenith-anti-sun line. It remains zero around a circle based on the sun and the zenith. As it passes the zenith it rotates toward the south and repeats the same pattern until sunset.

The second image to the right represents the u input mapped onto the celestial sphere. The u stokes parameter changes signs depending on which quadrant it is in. The four quadrants are defined by the line of symmetry, the effective East-Zenith-West plane and the North-Zenith-South plane. It is not symmetric because it is defined by the angles ±45°. In a sense it makes two circles around the line of symmetry as opposed to only one.

It is easily understood when compared with the q input. Where the q input is halfway between 0° and 90°, the u input is either positive at +45° or negative at −45°. Similarly if the q input is positive at 90° or negative at 0° the u input is halfway between +45° and −45°. This can be seen at the non symmetric circles about the line of symmetry. It then follows the same pattern across the sky as the q input.

=== Neutral points and lines ===
Areas where the degree of polarization is zero (the skylight is unpolarized), are known as neutral points. Here the Stokes parameters Q and U also equal zero by definition. The degree of polarization therefore increases with increasing distance from the neutral points.

These conditions are met at a few defined locations on the sky. The Arago point is located above the antisolar point, while the Babinet and Brewster points are located above and below the sun respectively. The zenith distance of the Babinet or Arago point increases with increasing solar zenith distance. These neutral points can depart from their regular positions due to interference from dust and other aerosols.

The skylight polarization switches from negative to positive while passing a neutral point parallel to the solar or antisolar meridian. The lines that separate the regions of positive Q and negative Q are called neutral lines.

=== Depolarization ===
The Rayleigh sky causes a clearly defined polarization pattern under many different circumstances. The degree of polarization however, does not always remain consistent and may in fact decrease in different situations. The Rayleigh sky may undergo depolarization due to nearby objects such as clouds and large reflecting surfaces such as the ocean. It may also change depending on the time of the day (for instance at twilight or night).

In the night, the polarization of the moonlit sky is very strongly reduced in the presence of urban light pollution, because scattered urban light is not strongly polarized.

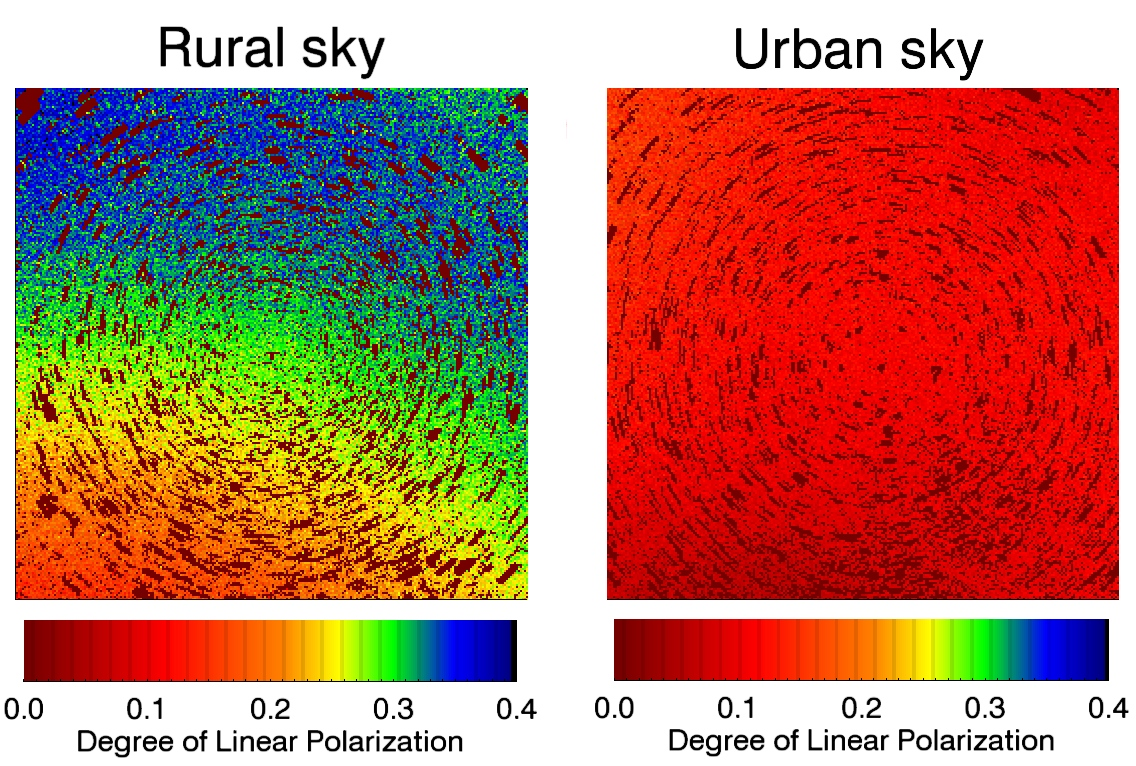
Light pollution is mostly unpolarized, and its addition to moonlight results in a decreased polarization signal.

Extensive research shows that the angle of polarization in a clear sky continues underneath clouds if the air beneath the cloud is directly lit by the Sun. The scattering of direct sunlight on those clouds results in the same polarization pattern. In other words, the proportion of the sky that follows the Rayleigh Sky Model is high for both clear skies and cloudy skies. The pattern is also clearly visible in small visible patches of sky. The celestial angle of polarization is unaffected by clouds.

Polarization patterns remain consistent even when the Sun is not present in the sky. Twilight patterns are produced during the time period between the beginning of astronomical twilight (when the Sun is 18° below the horizon) and sunrise, or sunset and the end of astronomical twilight. The duration of astronomical twilight depends on the length of the path taken by the Sun below the horizon. Thus it depends on the time of year as well as the location, but it can last for as long as 1.5 hours.

The polarization pattern caused by twilight remains fairly consistent throughout this time period. This is because the sun is moving below the horizon nearly perpendicular to it, and its azimuth therefore changes very slowly throughout this time period.

At twilight, scattered polarized light originates in the upper atmosphere and then traverses the entire lower atmosphere before reaching the observer. This provides multiple scattering opportunities and causes depolarization. It has been seen that polarization increases by about 10% from the onset of twilight to dawn. Therefore, the pattern remains consistent while the degree changes slightly.

Not only do polarization patterns remain consistent as the sun moves across the sky, but also as the moon moves across the sky at night. The Moon creates the same polarization pattern. Thus it is possible to use the polarization patterns as a tool for navigation at night. The only difference is that the degree of polarization is not quite as strong.

Underlying surface properties can affect the degree of polarization of the daytime sky. The degree of polarization has a strong dependence on surface properties. As the surface reflectance or optical thickness increase, the degree of polarization decreases. The Rayleigh sky near the ocean can therefore be highly depolarized.

Lastly, there is a clear wavelength dependence in Rayleigh scattering. It is greatest at short wavelengths, whereas skylight polarization is greatest at middle to long wavelengths. Initially it is greatest in the ultraviolet, but as light moves to the Earth's surface and interacts via multiple-path scattering it becomes high at middle to long wavelengths. The angle of polarization shows no variation with wavelength.

== Uses ==
=== Navigation ===
Many animals, typically insects, are sensitive to the polarization of light and can therefore use the polarization patterns of the daytime sky as a tool for navigation. This theory was first proposed by Karl von Frisch when looking at the celestial orientation of honeybees. The natural sky polarization pattern serves as an easily detected compass. From the polarization patterns, these species can orient themselves by determining the exact position of the Sun without the use of direct sunlight. Thus, under cloudy skies, or even at night, animals can find their way.

Using polarized light as a compass however is no easy task. The animal must be capable of detecting and analyzing polarized light. These species have specialized photoreceptors in their eyes that respond to the orientation and the degree of polarization near the zenith. They can extract information on the intensity and orientation of the degree of polarization. They can then incorporate this visually to orient themselves and recognize different properties of surfaces.

There is clear evidence that animals can even orient themselves when the Sun is below the horizon at twilight. How well insects might orient themselves using nocturnal polarization patterns is still a topic of study. So far, it is known that nocturnal crickets have wide-field polarization sensors and should be able to use the night-time polarization patterns to orient themselves. It has also been seen that nocturnally migrating birds become disoriented when the polarization pattern at twilight is unclear.

The best example is the halicitid bee Megalopta genalis, which inhabits the rainforests in Central America and scavenges before sunrise and after sunset. This bee leaves its nest approximately 1 hour before sunrise, forages for up to 30 minutes, and accurately returns to its nest before sunrise. It acts similarly just after sunset.

Thus, this bee is an example of an insect that can perceive polarization patterns throughout astronomical twilight. Not only does this case exemplify the fact that polarization patterns are present during twilight, but it remains as a perfect example that when light conditions are challenging the bee orients itself based on the polarization patterns of the twilight sky.

It has been suggested that Vikings were able to navigate on the open sea in a similar fashion, using the birefringent crystal Iceland spar, which they called "sunstone", to determine the orientation of the sky's polarization. This would allow the navigator to locate the Sun, even when it was obscured by cloud cover. An actual example of such a "sunstone" was found on a sunken (Tudor) ship dated 1592, in proximity to the ship's navigational equipment.

=== Non-polarized objects ===
Both artificial and natural objects in the sky can be very difficult to detect using only the intensity of light. These objects include clouds, satellites, and aircraft. However, the polarization of these objects due to resonant scattering, emission, reflection, or other phenomena can differ from that of the background illumination. Thus, they can be more easily detected by using polarization imaging. There is a wide range of remote sensing applications in which polarization is useful for detecting objects that are otherwise difficult to see.

== Notes and references ==
- Polarization Patterns of the Twilight Sky. Cronin T.W. et al., 2005, SPIE, 5888, 389
- Polarization patterns of the summer sky and its neutral points measured by full-sky imaging polarimetry in Finnish Lapland north of the Arctic Circle. Gál J. et al. 2001, Proc. R. Soc. Lond. 457, 1385
- Polarized radiance distribution measurement of skylight. Liu Y. & Voss K., 1997, ApOpt, 36, 8753
- How the clear-sky angle of polarization pattern continues underneath clouds: full-sky measurements and implications for animal orientation. Pomozi, I. et al., 2001, J. Exp. Biol., 204, 2933
