= Stokes parameters =

Set of values that describe the polarization state of electromagnetic radiation

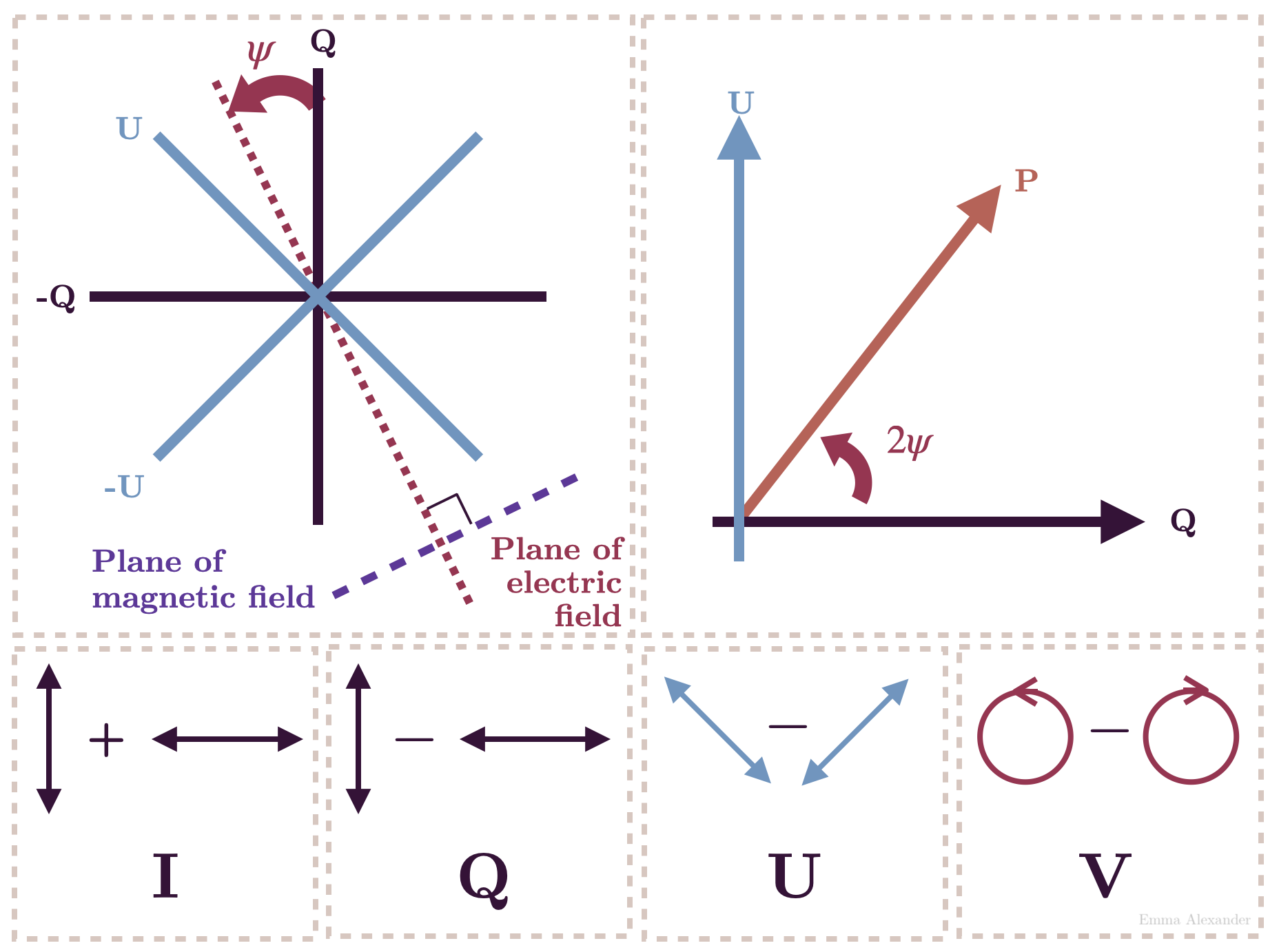
The Stokes I, Q, U and V parameters

The Stokes parameters are a set of values that describe the polarization state of electromagnetic radiation. They were defined by George Gabriel Stokes in 1851, as a mathematically convenient alternative to the more common description of incoherent or partially polarized radiation in terms of its total intensity (I), (fractional) degree of polarization (p), and the shape parameters of the polarization ellipse. The effect of an optical system on the polarization of light can be determined by constructing the Stokes vector for the input light and applying Mueller calculus, to obtain the Stokes vector of the light leaving the system. They can be determined from directly observable phenomena. The original Stokes paper was discovered independently by Francis Perrin in 1942 and by Subrahamanyan Chandrasekhar in 1947, who named it as the Stokes parameters.

== Definitions ==
Polarisation ellipse, showing the relationship to the Poincaré sphere parameters ψ and χ.

The Poincaré sphere is the parametrisation of the last three Stokes' parameters in spherical coordinates.

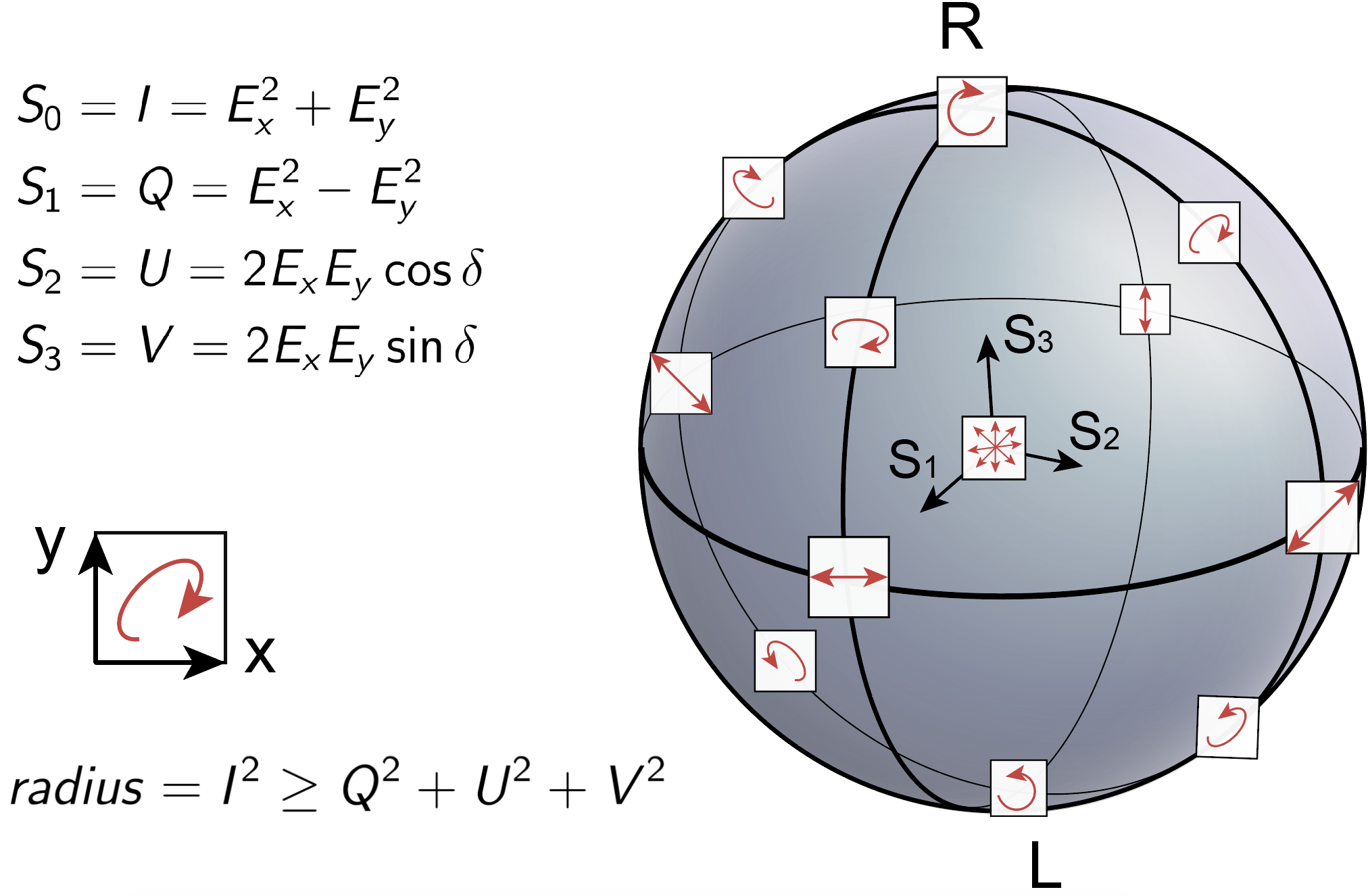
Depiction of the polarization states on Poincaré sphere

The relationship of the Stokes parameters S_{0}, S_{1}, S_{2}, S_{3} to intensity and polarization ellipse parameters is shown in the equations below and the figure on the right.

$$\begin{align}
S_0 &= I \\
S_1 &= I p \cos 2\psi \cos 2\chi \\
S_2 &= I p \sin 2\psi \cos 2\chi \\
S_3 &= I p \sin 2\chi
\end{align}$$

Here $I p$, $2\psi$ and $2\chi$ are the spherical coordinates of the three-dimensional vector of cartesian coordinates $(S_1, S_2, S_3)$. $I$ is the total intensity of the beam, and $p$ is the degree of polarization, constrained by $0 \le p \le 1$. The factor of two before $\psi$ represents the fact that any polarization ellipse is indistinguishable from one rotated by 180°, while the factor of two before $\chi$ indicates that an ellipse is indistinguishable from one with the semi-axis lengths swapped accompanied by a 90° rotation. The phase information of the polarized light is not recorded in the Stokes parameters. The four Stokes parameters are sometimes denoted I, Q, U and V, respectively.

Given the Stokes parameters, one can solve for the spherical coordinates with the following equations:

$$\begin{align}
I &= S_0 \\
p &= \frac{\sqrt{S_1^2 + S_2^2 + S_3^2}}{S_0} \\
2\psi &= \mathrm{arctan} \frac{S_2}{S_1}\\
2\chi &= \mathrm{arctan} \frac{S_3}{\sqrt{S_1^2+S_2^2}}\\
\end{align}$$

=== Stokes vectors ===
The Stokes parameters are often combined into a vector, known as the Stokes vector:

$$\vec S \ =
\begin{pmatrix} S_0 \\ S_1 \\ S_2 \\ S_3\end{pmatrix}
=
\begin{pmatrix} I \\ Q \\ U \\ V\end{pmatrix}$$

The Stokes vector can describe the state of unpolarized, partially polarized, and fully polarized light. For comparison, the Jones vector only describes fully polarized light, but is more useful for problems involving coherent light.

Note that there is an ambiguous sign for the $V$ component depending on the physical convention used. In practice, there are two separate conventions used, either defining the Stokes parameters when looking down the beam towards the source (opposite the direction of light propagation) or looking down the beam away from the source (coincident with the direction of light propagation). These two conventions result in different signs for $V$, and a convention must be chosen and adhered to.

==== Examples ====
Below are shown some Stokes vectors for common states of polarization of light.

$$\begin{pmatrix} 1 \\ 1 \\ 0 \\ 0\end{pmatrix}$$	Linearly polarized (horizontal)
$$\begin{pmatrix} 1 \\ -1 \\ 0 \\ 0\end{pmatrix}$$	Linearly polarized (vertical)
$$\begin{pmatrix} 1 \\ 0 \\ 1 \\ 0\end{pmatrix}$$	Linearly polarized (+45°)
$$\begin{pmatrix} 1 \\ 0 \\ -1 \\ 0\end{pmatrix}$$	Linearly polarized (−45°)
$$\begin{pmatrix} 1 \\ 0 \\ 0 \\ 1\end{pmatrix}$$	Right-hand circularly polarized
$$\begin{pmatrix} 1 \\ 0 \\ 0 \\ -1\end{pmatrix}$$	Left-hand circularly polarized
$$\begin{pmatrix} 1 \\ 0 \\ 0 \\ 0\end{pmatrix}$$	Unpolarized

== Alternative explanation ==

A monochromatic plane wave is specified by its propagation vector, $\vec{k}$, and the complex amplitudes of the electric field, $E_1$ and $E_2$, in a basis $(\hat{\epsilon}_1,\hat{\epsilon}_2)$. The pair $(E_1, E_2)$ is called a Jones vector. Alternatively, one may specify the propagation vector, the phase, $\phi$, and the polarization state, $\Psi$, where $\Psi$ is the curve traced out by the electric field as a function of time in a fixed plane. The most familiar polarization states are linear and circular, which are degenerate cases of the most general state, an ellipse.

One way to describe polarization is by giving the semi-major and semi-minor axes of the polarization ellipse, its orientation, and the direction of rotation (See the above figure). The Stokes parameters $I$, $Q$, $U$, and $V$, provide an alternative description of the polarization state which is experimentally convenient because each parameter corresponds to a sum or difference of measurable intensities. The next figure shows examples of the Stokes parameters in degenerate states.

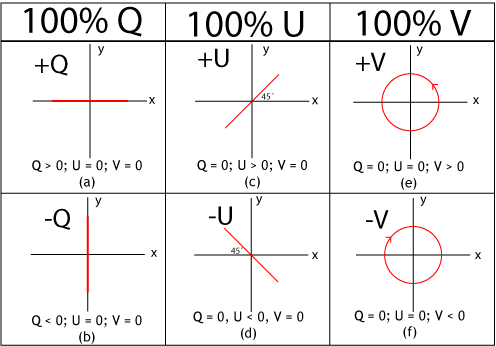

=== Definitions ===
The Stokes parameters are defined by

$$\begin{align}
I & \equiv \langle E_x^{2} \rangle + \langle E_y^{2} \rangle \\
& = \langle E_a^{2} \rangle + \langle E_b^{2} \rangle \\
& =  \langle E_r^{2} \rangle + \langle E_l^{2} \rangle, \\
Q & \equiv \langle E_x^{2} \rangle - \langle E_y^{2} \rangle, \\
U & \equiv \langle E_a^{2} \rangle - \langle E_b^{2} \rangle, \\
V & \equiv  \langle E_r^{2} \rangle - \langle E_l^{2} \rangle.
\end{align}$$

where the subscripts refer to three different bases of the space of Jones vectors: the standard Cartesian basis ($\hat{x},\hat{y}$), a Cartesian basis rotated by 45° ($\hat{a},\hat{b}$), and a circular basis ($\hat{l},\hat{r}$). The circular basis is defined so that $\hat{l} = (\hat{x}+i\hat{y})/\sqrt{2}$, $\hat{r} = (\hat{x}-i\hat{y})/\sqrt{2}$.

The symbols ⟨⋅⟩ represent expectation values. The light can be viewed as a random variable taking values in the space C^{2} of Jones vectors $(E_1, E_2)$. Any given measurement yields a specific wave (with a specific phase, polarization ellipse, and magnitude), but it keeps flickering and wobbling between different outcomes. The expectation values are various averages of these outcomes. Intense, but unpolarized light will have I > 0 but Q = U = V = 0, reflecting that no polarization type predominates. A convincing waveform is depicted at the article on coherence.

The opposite would be perfectly polarized light which, in addition, has a fixed, nonvarying amplitude—a pure sine curve. This is represented by a random variable with only a single possible value, say $(E_1, E_2)$. In this case one may replace the brackets by absolute value bars, obtaining a well-defined quadratic map

$$\begin{matrix}
I \equiv |E_x|^{2} + |E_y|^{2} = |E_a|^{2} + |E_b|^{2} = |E_r|^{2} + |E_l|^{2} \\
Q \equiv |E_x|^{2} - |E_y|^{2}, \\
U \equiv |E_a|^{2} - |E_b|^{2}, \\
V \equiv |E_r|^{2} - |E_l|^{2}.
\end{matrix}$$

from the Jones vectors to the corresponding Stokes vectors; more convenient forms are given below. The map takes its image in the cone defined by |I |^{2} = |Q |^{2} + |U |^{2} + |V |^{2}, where the purity of the state satisfies p = 1 (see below).

The next figure shows how the signs of the Stokes parameters are determined by the helicity and the orientation of the semi-major axis of the polarization ellipse. Note that the "handedness" of the V-parametre is accidentally reversed in the image below. Positive V is right-handed, negative V is left-handed (see e.g., pp. 46-53 of "Absorption and Scattering of Light by Small Particles" by Bohren & Huffman).

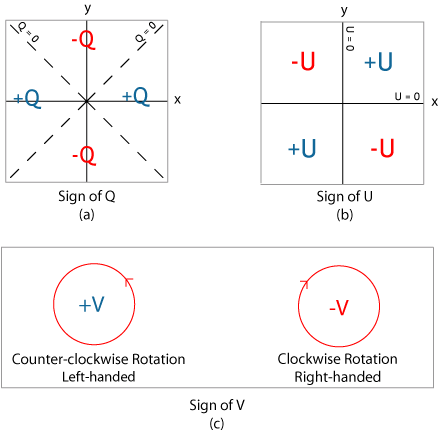

=== Representations in fixed bases ===
In a fixed ($\hat{x},\hat{y}$) basis, the Stokes parameters when using an increasing phase convention are

$$\begin{align}
I&=|E_x|^2+|E_y|^2, \\
Q&=|E_x|^2-|E_y|^2, \\
U&=2\mathrm{Re}(E_xE_y^*), \\
V&=-2\mathrm{Im}(E_xE_y^*), \\
\end{align}$$

while for $(\hat{a},\hat{b})$, they are

$$\begin{align}
I&=|E_a|^2+|E_b|^2, \\
Q&=-2\mathrm{Re}(E_a^{*}E_b), \\
U&=|E_a|^{2}-|E_b|^{2}, \\
V&=2\mathrm{Im}(E_a^{*}E_b). \\
\end{align}$$

and for $(\hat{l},\hat{r})$, they are

$$\begin{align}
I &=|E_l|^2+|E_r|^2, \\
Q &=2\mathrm{Re}(E_l^*E_r), \\
U & = -2\mathrm{Im}(E_l^*E_r), \\
V & =|E_r|^2-|E_l|^2. \\
\end{align}$$

== Properties ==
For purely monochromatic coherent radiation, it follows from the above equations that

$$Q^2+U^2+V^2 = I^2,$$

whereas for the whole (non-coherent) beam radiation, the Stokes parameters are defined as averaged quantities, and the previous equation becomes an inequality:

$$Q^2+U^2+V^2 \le I^2.$$

However, we can define a total polarization intensity $I_p$, so that

$$Q^{2} + U^2 +V^2 = I_p^2,$$

where $I_p/I$ is the total polarization fraction.

Let us define the complex intensity of linear polarization to be

$$\begin{align}
L & \equiv  |L|e^{i2\theta} \\
& \equiv  Q +iU. \\
\end{align}$$

Under a rotation $\theta \rightarrow \theta+\theta'$ of the polarization ellipse, it can be shown that $I$ and $V$ are invariant, but

$$\begin{align}
L & \rightarrow  e^{i2\theta'}L, \\
Q & \rightarrow  \mbox{Re}\left(e^{i2\theta'}L\right), \\
U & \rightarrow  \mbox{Im}\left(e^{i2\theta'}L\right).\\
\end{align}$$

With these properties, the Stokes parameters may be thought of as constituting three generalized intensities:

$$\begin{align}
I & \ge  0, \\
V & \in  \mathbb{R}, \\
L & \in  \mathbb{C}, \\
\end{align}$$

where $I$ is the total intensity, $|V|$ is the intensity of circular polarization, and $|L|$ is the intensity of linear polarization. The total intensity of polarization is $I_p=\sqrt{|L|^2+|V|^2}$, and the orientation and sense of rotation are given by

$$\begin{align}
\theta &= \frac{1}{2}\arg(L), \\
h &= \sgn(V). \\
\end{align}$$

Since $Q=\mbox{Re}(L)$ and $U=\mbox{Im}(L)$, we have

$$\begin{align}
|L| &= \sqrt{Q^2+U^2}, \\
\theta &= \frac{1}{2}\operatorname{atan2}(U,Q). \\
\end{align}$$

In the last formula, the two-argument arctangent function atan2 computes the principal argument of the complex number $Q + iU$.

== Relation to the polarization ellipse ==
In terms of the parameters of the polarization ellipse, the Stokes parameters are

$$\begin{align}
I_p & =  A^2 + B^2, \\
Q & =  (A^2-B^2)\cos(2\theta), \\
U & =  (A^2-B^2)\sin(2\theta), \\
V & =  2ABh. \\
\end{align}$$

Inverting the previous equation gives

$$\begin{align}
A & =  \sqrt{\frac{1}{2}(I_p+|L|)} \\
B & =  \sqrt{\frac{1}{2}(I_p-|L|)} \\
\theta & =  \frac{1}{2}\arg(L)\\
h & =  \sgn(V). \\
\end{align}$$

== Measurement ==
The Stokes parameters (and thus the polarization of some electromagnetic radiation) can be directly determined from observation. Using a linear polarizer and a quarter-wave plate, the following system of equations relating the Stokes parameters to measured intensity can be obtained:

$$\begin{align}
I_l(0) &= \frac12 (I + Q)\\
I_l(\frac{\pi}4) &= \frac12 (I + U)\\
I_l(\frac{\pi}2) &= \frac12 (I - Q)\\
I_q(\frac{\pi}4) &= \frac12 (I + V),\\
\end{align}$$

where $I_l(\theta)$ is the irradiance of the radiation at a point when the linear polarizer is rotated at an angle of $\theta$, and similarly $I_q(\theta)$ is the irradiance at a point when the quarter-wave plate is rotated at an angle of $\theta$. A system can be implemented using both plates at once at different angles to measure the parameters. This can give a more accurate measure of the relative magnitudes of the parameters (which is often the main result desired) due to all parameters being affected by the same losses.

== Relationship to Hermitian operators and quantum mixed states ==
From a geometric and algebraic point of view, the Stokes parameters stand in one-to-one correspondence with the closed, convex, 4-real-dimensional cone of nonnegative Hermitian operators on the Hilbert space C^{2}. The parameter I serves as the trace of the operator, whereas the entries of the matrix of the operator are simple linear functions of the four parameters I, Q, U, V, serving as coefficients in a linear combination of the Stokes operators. The eigenvalues and eigenvectors of the operator can be calculated from the polarization ellipse parameters I, p, ψ, χ.

The Stokes parameters with I set equal to 1 (i.e. the trace 1 operators) are in one-to-one correspondence with the closed unit 3-dimensional ball of mixed states (or density operators) of the quantum space C^{2}, whose boundary is the Bloch sphere. The Jones vectors correspond to the underlying space C^{2}, that is, the (unnormalized) pure states of the same system. Note that the overall phase (i.e. the common phase factor between the two component waves on the two perpendicular polarization axes) is lost when passing from a pure state |φ⟩ to the corresponding mixed state |φ⟩⟨φ|, just as it is lost when passing from a Jones vector to the corresponding Stokes vector.

In the basis of horizontal polarization state $|H\rangle$ and vertical polarization state $|V\rangle$, the +45° linear polarization state is $|+\rangle =\frac{1}{\sqrt2}(|H\rangle+|V\rangle)$, the -45° linear polarization state is $|-\rangle =\frac{1}{\sqrt2}(|H\rangle-|V\rangle)$, the left hand circular polarization state is $|L\rangle =\frac{1}{\sqrt2}(|H\rangle+i|V\rangle)$, and the right hand circular polarization state is $|R\rangle =\frac{1}{\sqrt2}(|H\rangle-i|V\rangle)$. It's easy to see that these states are the eigenvectors of Pauli matrices, and that the normalized Stokes parameters (U/I, V/I, Q/I) correspond to the coordinates of the Bloch vector ($a_x$, $a_y$, $a_z$). Equivalently, we have $U/I=tr\left(\rho \sigma_x \right)$, $V/I=tr\left(\rho \sigma_y \right)$, $Q/I=tr\left(\rho \sigma_z \right)$, where $\rho$ is the density matrix of the mixed state.

Generally, a linear polarization at angle θ has a pure quantum state $|\theta\rangle =\cos{\theta}|H\rangle+\sin{\theta}|V\rangle$; therefore, the transmittance of a linear polarizer/analyzer at angle θ for a mixed state light source with density matrix $\rho = \frac{1}{2}\left(I + a_x \sigma_x + a_y \sigma_y + a_z \sigma_z\right)$ is $tr(\rho|\theta\rangle\langle\theta|) = \frac{1}{2}\left(1 + a_x \sin{2\theta} + a_z \cos{2\theta}\right)$, with a maximum transmittance of $\frac{1}{2} (1+ \sqrt{ a_x^2 + a_z^2 })$ at $\theta_0 = \frac{1}{2}\arctan{ (a_x/a_z) }$ if $a_z > 0$, or at $\theta_0 = \frac{1}{2}\arctan{ (a_x/a_z) }+\frac{\pi}{2}$ if $a_z < 0$; the minimum transmittance of $\frac{1}{2} ( 1- \sqrt{ a_x^2 + a_z^2 })$ is reached at the perpendicular to the maximum transmittance direction. Here, the ratio of maximum transmittance to minimum transmittance is defined as the extinction ratio $ER = (1 + DOLP) / (1 - DOLP)$, where the degree of linear polarization is $DOLP = \sqrt{ a_x^2 + a_z^2 }$. Equivalently, the formula for the transmittance can be rewritten as $A\cos^2{(\theta- \theta_0)} + B$, which is an extended form of Malus's law; here, $A, B$ are both non-negative, and is related to the extinction ratio by $ER = (A+B)/B$. Two of the normalized Stokes parameters can also be calculated by $a_x=DOLP\sin{2\theta_0}, \, a_z=DOLP\cos{ 2\theta_0}, \, DOLP=(ER-1)/(ER+1)$.

It's also worth noting that a rotation of polarization axis by angle θ corresponds to the Bloch sphere rotation operator
$$R_y (2\theta)   =
\begin{bmatrix}
\cos \theta  & -\sin \theta \\
\sin \theta & \cos \theta
\end{bmatrix}$$
. For example, the horizontal polarization state $|H\rangle$ would rotate to $|\theta\rangle =\cos{\theta}|H\rangle+\sin{\theta}|V\rangle$. The effect of a quarter-wave plate aligned to the horizontal axis is described by
$$R_z (\pi /2)=
\begin{bmatrix}
e^{ -i\pi/4 } & 0 \\
0 & e^{ +i\pi/4 }
\end{bmatrix}$$
, or equivalently the Phase gate S, and the resulting Bloch vector becomes $(-a_y,a_x,a_z)$. With this configuration, if we perform the rotating analyzer method to measure the extinction ratio, we will be able to calculate $a_y$ and also verify $a_z$. For this method to work, the fast axis and the slow axis of the waveplate must be aligned with the reference directions for the basis states.

The effect of a quarter-wave plate rotated by angle θ can be determined by Rodrigues' rotation formula as $R_n (\pi/2)=\frac{1}{\sqrt2}I-i\frac{1}{\sqrt2} (\hat{n} \cdot \vec{\sigma} )$, with $\hat{n}=\hat{z}\cos{2\theta}+\hat{x} \sin{2\theta}$. The transmittance of the resulting light through a linear polarizer (analyzer plate) along the horizontal axis can be calculated using the same Rodrigues' rotation formula and focusing on its components on $I$ and $\sigma_z$:

$$\begin{align}
T&= tr[R_n(\pi/2) \rho R_n (- \pi/2)|H\rangle\langle H|] \\
&= \frac{1}{2}\left[ 1 + a_y \sin{2\theta} + (\hat{n}\cdot \vec{a}) \cos{2\theta}\right] \\
&= \frac{1}{2}\left[ 1 + a_y \sin{2\theta} + (a_x \sin{2\theta} + a_z \cos{2\theta}) \cos{2\theta}\right] \\
&= \frac{1}{2}\left( 1 + a_y \sin{2\theta} +DOLP\times \frac{\cos{(4\theta-2\theta_0) }+\cos{(2\theta_0) }}{2 }\right)
\end{align}$$

The above expression is the theory basis of many polarimeters. For unpolarized light, T=1/2 is a constant. For purely circularly polarized light, T has a sinusoidal dependence on angle θ with a period of 180 degrees, and can reach absolute extinction where T=0. For purely linearly polarized light, T has a sinusoidal dependence on angle θ with a period of 90 degrees, and absolute extinction is only reachable when the original light's polarization is at 90 degrees from the polarizer (i.e. $a_z =-1$). In this configuration, $\theta_0=\frac{\pi}{2}$ and $T=\frac{1- \cos{(4\theta)}}{4}$, with a maximum of 1/2 at θ=45°, and an extinction point at θ=0°. This result can be used to precisely determine the fast or slow axis of a quarter-wave plate, for example, by using a polarizing beam splitter to obtain a linearly polarized light aligned to the analyzer plate and rotating the quarter-wave plate in between.

Similarly, the effect of a half-wave plate rotated by angle θ is described by $R_n (\pi)=-i(\hat{n} \cdot \vec{\sigma} )$, which transforms the density matrix to:

$$\begin{align}
R_n(\pi) \rho R_n (-\pi) &= \frac{1}{2}\left(I+\vec{a}\cdot[-\vec{\sigma}+2\hat{n} (\hat{n}\cdot\vec{\sigma} )]\right) \\
&= \frac{1}{2}\left[I- \vec{a} \cdot \vec{\sigma}+2(\hat{n}\cdot\vec{a} ) (\hat{n}\cdot\vec{\sigma} )\right]
\end{align}$$

The above expression demonstrates that if the original light is of pure linear polarization (i.e. $a_y= 0$), the resulting light after the half-wave plate is still of pure linear polarization (i.e. without $\sigma_y$ component) with a rotated major axis. Such rotation of the linear polarization has a sinusoidal dependence on angle θ with a period of 90 degrees.

== See also ==
- Mueller calculus
- Jones calculus
- Polarization (waves)
- Rayleigh Sky Model
- Stokes operators
- Polarization mixing
