= Bo Thidé =

Swedish physicist (born 1948)

- Born: 8 January 1948 (age 78); Gothenburg, Sweden
- Education: Uppsala University
- Known for: Quantum Mechanics, Electrodynamics, Plasma, Space physics
- Scientific career
- Fields: Physicist
- Workplaces: Swedish Institute of Space Physics and Uppsala University
- Doctoral advisor: Per Olof Fröman

Bo Yngve Thidé (born 8 January 1948) is a Swedish physicist and professor emeritus at Uppsala University. He has studied radio waves and other electromagnetic radiation in space, particularly their interaction with matter and fields.

Thidé was born in Gothenburg, Sweden. He received his B.Sc. in 1972, his M.Sc. in 1973, and defended his Ph.D. thesis on semiclassical quantum theory at Uppsala University in 1979. His Ph.D. was obtained under the supervision of professor Per Olof Fröman at the Department of Theoretical Physics, Uppsala University. He has worked at the Swedish Institute of Space Physics in Uppsala since 1980, where he has been a professor since 2000.

In 1981, Bo Thidé discovered electromagnetic emissions stimulated by powerful radio waves in the ionosphere during experiments in August 1981 at the EISCAT facility in Tromsø, Norway. For the first time it was shown that the plasma turbulence excited by powerful radio waves in the ionosphere radiates secondary electromagnetic radiation that can be detected and analysed on the ground. These stimulated electromagnetic emissions (SEE) exhibit a rich spectral structure, particularly near harmonics of the ionospheric electron gyro frequency. The SEE technique is now a useful tool in plasma turbulence research. For his discovery, Thidé was awarded the Edlund Prize of the Royal Swedish Academy of Sciences in 1991.

In the mid-1980s, Thidé published a series of papers together with Bengt Lundborg on a highly accurate analytic approximation method to calculate the full three-dimensional wave pattern, spin angular momentum (polarization) and other properties of radio waves propagating in an inhomogeneous, magnetized, collisional plasma.

Thidé was involved in a project in The Netherlands where 12 500 antenna designed to analyse solar storms were built. In 2001 he led the LOIS-project, that placed tens of thousands of antenna in southern Sweden. The project was a subsidiary of the multinational LOFAR project headed by The Netherlands and aimed to find traces of the first hydrogen atom formed during Big Bang.

Together with colleagues from Italy and Spain, Thidé discovered in 2010 a new phenomenon in General Relativity which allows the detection of spinning black holes by analysing the orbital angular momentum and optical vortex structure of radiation from the accretion disk near the black holes. The results were published in Nature Physics. He was later part of a team which discovered that radio beams from fast-spinning black holes are twisted.

Thidé has advocated Orbital angular momentum multiplexing for radio transmissions, opening up additional degrees of freedom. Thidé is the author of the book Electromagnetic Field Theory, which is used in the course Classical Electrodynamics at Uppsala University and University of Padua. He has also worked on fiber optics technology.

Since 2016, he lives outside Söderhamn, where he continues his research from home.

== See also ==
- Orbital angular momentum multiplexing
- Optical vortex
