= Alan James Duncan =

Scottish atomic physicist

FRSE FRSA Alan James Duncan
- Born: 4 November 1938; Kingston, East Lothian, Scotland
- Died: 9 July 1999 (aged 60); British Columbia, Canada
- Education: University of St Andrews
- Scientific career
- Fields: Nuclear physics
- Workplaces: University of Stirling

Alan James Duncan FRSE FRSA (4 November 1938 – 9 July 1999) was a Scottish atomic physicist who created a metastable atomic hydrogen beam apparatus used to first observe the two-photon decay of metastable hydrogen and measure fundamental predictions of quantum theory.

The Science and Engineering Research Council of UK placed him highly in their publication Highlights in Physics (1985)

== Life ==
He was born on 4 November 1938 at Kingston near North Berwick. He was educated at North Berwick Primary and Secondary Schools. After a brief spell in the English educational system at South Shields and Newcastle he became disillusioned and returned to the Scottish system, gaining a place studying Natural Philosophy (physics) and Mathematics at St Andrews University graduating BSc in 1961 and winning the university's Neil Arnott Prize. In 1965 he went to the US to undertake postgraduate studies, largely looking at plasma physics, at Stanford University in California where he gained a doctorate.

In 1970 he began lecturing in physics at the newly created Stirling University in central Scotland. He then joined Hans Kleinpoppen's Atomic Physics Research Group.

His final works included a collaboration with Marlan Scully on two-photon radiation, and a project with Miles Padgett and Wilson Sibbett to create optical instruments to measure the Orbital angular momentum of light. He also created a Fourier transform spectrometer to measure atmospheric pollution, and an optical Profilometer to record surface profiles. The latter won joint first prize in the 1998 National Physics Laboratory Awards.

In 1992 he was elected a Fellow of the Royal Society of Edinburgh. His proposers were H R Wilson, Hans Kleinpoppen, G V Marr, R J Roberts, J R Sargent, Wilson Sibbett and A J Forty.

Only in 1998 did he receive a chair, becoming Professor of Experimental Physics at Stirling.

He died suddenly whilst on holiday with his wife in British Columbia on 9 July 1999.

== Family ==
He had one son, Robert Duncan, and one daughter, Fiona Duncan, by his wife Irene.
