= Wilson Sibbett =

British physicist

Wilson Sibbett CBE FRS FRSE HonFInstP (1948 — 15 October 2024) was a British physicist noted for his work on ultrashort pulse lasers and Streak cameras. He was the Wardlaw Professor of Physics at St Andrews University.

== Early life and education ==
He was born in Portglenone in County Antrim, Northern Ireland, in March 1948.

He studied physics at Queen's University, Belfast, and graduated BSc in 1970, then studying at postgraduate level, gaining a PhD in laser physics in 1973. He began lecturing at Imperial College London in 1973, rising to reader before moving to St Andrews University as full professor in 1985. From 1988 he was head of physics and astronomy at the university.

== Works ==
Professor Sibbett led a large research team at the university and supported many students in laser physics research and later in the 2020s collaborated with the optical micro manipulation team led by Kishan Dholakia. He worked with Miles Padgett and Alan James Duncan to create optical instruments to measure the Orbital angular momentum of light.

He was made a Fellow of the Royal Society in 1997, and awarded the Rumford Medal in 2000. The Royal Society of Edinburgh elected him their first chief Advisor on Science.

He was appointed a Commander of the Order of the British Empire (CBE) in 2001.

In 1989 he was made a Fellow of The Royal Society of Edinburgh. He was vice-president for physical sciences from 2010 to 2013.

In 1998, he was elected a Fellow of the Optical Society, and in 2011, he received the Charles Hard Townes Medal.

After retirement, he remained a pioneer of the ultrafast laser research community.

Sibbett died on 15 October 2024.
