= Natalia M. Litchinitser =

Electrical Engineer and Professor

- Education: Illinois Institute of Technology (PhD); Moscow State University
- Scientific career
- Workplaces: Duke University; University of Michigan
- Thesis: Theoretical investigation of fiber Bragg grating filters for dispersion compensation in optical communication systems (1997)

Natalia M. Litchinitser is an Electrical Engineer and Professor at Duke University. She works on optical metamaterials and their application in photonic devices. Litchinitser is a Fellow of the American Physical Society, The Optical Society and the Institute of Electrical and Electronics Engineers.

== Early life and education ==
Litchinitser was born in Russia. She earned her undergraduate degree in physics at the Moscow State University. She moved to the United States for her graduate studies and she joined the Illinois Institute of Technology. Her doctoral research considered Fiber Bragg grating filters for the compensation of dispersion. In 1997 Litchinitser joined the Institute of Optics in Rochester, New York, where she was made a postdoctoral research fellow. She joined Bell Labs at the same time that the field of metamaterials was emerging, and switched her focus on the theoretical properties of metamaterials that manipulate the visible portion of the electromagnetic spectrum. In 2005 Litchinitser moved to the University of Michigan.

== Research and career ==
In 2008 Litchinitser was made an Assistant Professor of Optics at the State University of New York, and was promoted to Associate Professor in 2011. She moved to Duke University in 2018. Her research focuses on metamaterials and topological photonics. Metamaterials are artificial structures that manipulate waves using a carefully controlled nanostructure as opposed to chemistry. She has used metamaterials to create a hyperlens; that is, a lens that escapes the diffraction limit by converting evanescent waves into propagating waves. To create the lens Litchinitser made use of gold and poly(methyl methacrylate) arranged in Slinky-like formation, which can overcome the diffraction limit to visible light. It is hoped that such lens could be used to improve the resolution of endoscopes, allowing early detection of certain cancers.

Litchinitser makes use of metamaterials to manipulate electric and magnetic fields, engineering shaped beams of light. These shaped beams (rather than the typical 'circular' beam, a beam that is shaped more like a vortex) of light allow access to otherwise forbidden higher-order spectroscopic transitions. Metamaterials offer the potential to tailor the orbital angular momentum and polarisation states of light. Circularly polarised light involves an electric field that rotates around the direction of propagation, such that the photons carry spin angular momentum. When spin-orbit interactions are controlled, spin angular momentum can be converted into orbital angular momentum. Orbital angular momentum (or vortex beams) can make symmetry-forbidden transitions possible, with a transition rate that increases when the size of the beam decreases. She has since shown that it is possible to measure a vortex laser's orbital angular momentum modes using a tunable micro-transceiver chip-based detector, offering hope that such systems could be used for fast data transmission. The detector makes use of a photodetector that is responsive to orbital angular momentum modes.

Topological photonics looks to navigate light around tight corners using tiny waveguides that eliminate the scattering of light. To achieve this, Litchinitser designed crystal lattices with carefully controlled geometries, which allow light to travel perfectly across their surfaces but block it from travelling through the interior. The ability for light to travel around corners is essential for photonic-based microchips, which will be essential for future data transmission.

Litchinitser delivered a plenary lecture at the 2018 SPIE Optics and Photonics conference, where she discussed the interaction of structured light and nanostructured media. At the 2020 SPIE Optics and Photonics conference Litchinitser chaired the session on Nanoscience and Engineering.

== Awards and honours ==
- 2011 Elected Fellow of The Optical Society
- 2014 Elected Fellow of the American Physical Society
- 2026 Elected IEEE Fellow

== Select publications ==
- Litchinitser, N. M.; Abeeluck, A. K.; Headley, C.; Eggleton, B. J. (2002-09-15). "Antiresonant reflecting photonic crystal optical waveguides". Optics Letters. 27 (18): 1592–1594. Bibcode:2002OptL...27.1592L. doi:10.1364/OL.27.001592. ISSN 1539-4794. PMID 18026511.
- Shalaev, Mikhail I.; Sun, Jingbo; Tsukernik, Alexander; Pandey, Apra; Nikolskiy, Kirill; Litchinitser, Natalia M. (2015-09-09). "High-Efficiency All-Dielectric Metasurfaces for Ultracompact Beam Manipulation in Transmission Mode". Nano Letters. 15 (9): 6261–6266. arXiv:1507.06259. Bibcode:2015NanoL..15.6261S. doi:10.1021/acs.nanolett.5b02926. ISSN 1530-6984. PMID 26280735. S2CID 16575708.
- Litchinitser, Natalia M.; Dunn, Steven C.; Usner, Brian; Eggleton, Benjamin J.; White, Thomas P.; McPhedran, Ross C.; Sterke, C. Martijn de (2003-05-19). "Resonances in microstructured optical waveguides". Optics Express. 11 (10): 1243–1251. Bibcode:2003OExpr..11.1243L. doi:10.1364/OE.11.001243. ISSN 1094-4087. PMID 19465990.
- Litchinitser, Natalia M., author. (9 January 2018). Metamaterials : from linear to nonlinear optics. Wiley. ISBN 978-3-527-40893-1. OCLC 864790261.
