= Angular momentum of light =

Physical quantity carried in photons

The total angular momentum of light consists of two components, both of which act in a different way on a massive colloidal particle inserted into the beam. The spin component causes the particle to spin around its axis, while the other component, known as orbital angular momentum (OAM), causes the particle to rotate around the axis of the beam.

The angular momentum of light is a vector quantity that expresses the amount of dynamical rotation present in the electromagnetic field of the light. While traveling approximately in a straight line, a beam of light can also be rotating (or "spinning", or "twisting") around its own axis. This rotation, while not visible to the naked eye, can be revealed by the interaction of the light beam with matter.

There are two distinct forms of rotation of a light beam, one involving its polarization and the other its wavefront shape. These two forms of rotation are therefore associated with two distinct forms of angular momentum, respectively named light spin angular momentum (SAM) and light orbital angular momentum (OAM).

The total angular momentum of light (or, more generally, of the electromagnetic field and the other force fields) and matter is conserved in time.

== Introduction ==
Light, or more generally an electromagnetic wave, carries not only energy but also momentum, which is a characteristic property of all objects in translational motion. The existence of this momentum becomes apparent in the "radiation pressure" phenomenon, in which a light beam transfers its momentum to an absorbing or scattering object, generating a mechanical pressure on it in the process.

Light may also carry angular momentum, which is a property of all objects in rotational motion. For example, a light beam can be rotating around its own axis while it propagates forward. Again, the existence of this angular momentum can be made evident by transferring it to small absorbing or scattering particles, which are thus subject to an optical torque.

For a light beam, one can usually distinguish two "forms of rotation", the first associated with the dynamical rotation of the electric and magnetic fields around the propagation direction, and the second with the dynamical rotation of light rays around the main beam axis. These two rotations are associated with two forms of angular momentum, namely SAM and OAM. However this distinction becomes blurred for strongly focused or diverging beams, and in the general case only the total angular momentum of a light field can be defined. An important limiting case in which the distinction is instead clear and unambiguous is that of a "paraxial" light beam, that is a well collimated beam in which all light rays (or, more precisely, all Fourier components of the optical field) only form small angles with the beam axis.

For such a beam, SAM is strictly related with the optical polarization, and in particular with the so-called circular polarization. OAM is related with the spatial field distribution, and in particular with the wavefront helical shape.

In addition to these two terms, if the origin of coordinates is located outside the beam axis, there is a third angular momentum contribution obtained as the cross-product of the beam position and its total momentum. This third term is also called "orbital", because it depends on the spatial distribution of the field. However, since its value is dependent from the choice of the origin, it is termed "external" orbital angular momentum, as opposed to the "internal" OAM appearing for helical beams.

== Mathematical expressions for the angular momentum of light ==
One commonly used expression for the total angular momentum of an electromagnetic field is the following one, in which there is no explicit distinction between the two forms of rotation:
$$\mathbf{J} = \varepsilon_0 \int \mathbf{r} \times \left(\mathbf{E} \times \mathbf{B}\right) d^3\mathbf{r} ,$$
where $\mathbf{E}$ and $\mathbf{B}$ are the electric and magnetic fields, respectively, $\epsilon_0$ is the vacuum permittivity and we are using SI units.

However, another expression of the angular momentum naturally arising from Noether's theorem is the following one, in which there are two separate terms that may be associated with SAM ($\mathbf{S}$) and OAM ($\mathbf{L}$):
$$\mathbf{J} = \varepsilon_0 \int \left(\mathbf{E} \times \mathbf{A}\right) d^3\mathbf{r} + \varepsilon_0 \sum_{i=x,y,z} \int \left(E^i \left(\mathbf{r} \times \boldsymbol{\nabla}\right) A^i\right) d^3\mathbf{r} = \mathbf{S} + \mathbf{L} ,$$
where $\mathbf{A}$ is the vector potential of the magnetic field, and the i-superscripted symbols denote the cartesian components of the corresponding vectors.

These two expressions can be proved to be equivalent to each other for any electromagnetic field that satisfies Maxwell's equations with no source charges and vanishes fast enough outside a finite region of space. The two terms in the second expression however are physically ambiguous, as they are not gauge-invariant. A gauge-invariant version can be obtained by replacing the vector potential A and the electric field E with their "transverse" or radiative component $\mathbf{A}_{\perp}$ and $\mathbf{E}_{\perp}$, thus obtaining the following expression:
$$\mathbf{J}_{\perp} = \varepsilon_0 \int \left(\mathbf{E}_{\perp}\times \mathbf{A}_{\perp}\right) d^3\mathbf{r} + \varepsilon_0 \sum_{i=x,y} \int \left({E^i}_{\perp} \left(\mathbf{r} \times \boldsymbol{\nabla}\right) A^i_{\perp}\right) d^3\mathbf{r} .$$

A justification for taking this step is yet to be provided. The latter expression has further problems, as it can be shown that the two terms are not true angular momenta as they do not obey the correct quantum commutation rules. Their sum, that is the total angular momentum, instead does.

An equivalent but simpler expression for a monochromatic wave of frequency ω, using the complex notation for the fields, is the following:
$$\mathbf{J} = \frac{\varepsilon_0}{2i\omega}\int \left(\mathbf{E}^\ast \times \mathbf{E}\right) d^3\mathbf{r} + \frac{\varepsilon_0}{2i\omega}\sum_{i=x,y,z} \int \left({E^i}^{\ast} \left(\mathbf{r}\times\boldsymbol{\nabla}\right) E^i\right) d^3\mathbf{r} .$$

Let us now consider the paraxial limit, with the beam axis assumed to coincide with the z axis of the coordinate system. In this limit the only significant component of the angular momentum is the z one, that is the angular momentum measuring the light beam rotation around its own axis, while the other two components are negligible.

$$\mathbf{J} \approx \frac{\hat{z}\epsilon_0}{2\omega}\int \left(\left|E_\text{L}\right|^2 - \left|E_\text{R}\right|^2\right) d^3\mathbf{r} +\frac{\hat{z}\varepsilon_0}{2i\omega} \int \sum_{i=x,y,z} \left({E^i}^\ast \frac{\partial}{\partial \phi} E^i\right) d^3\mathbf{r} .$$
where $E_\text{L}$ and $E_\text{R}$ denote the left and right circular polarization components, respectively.

== Exchange of spin and orbital angular momentum with matter ==
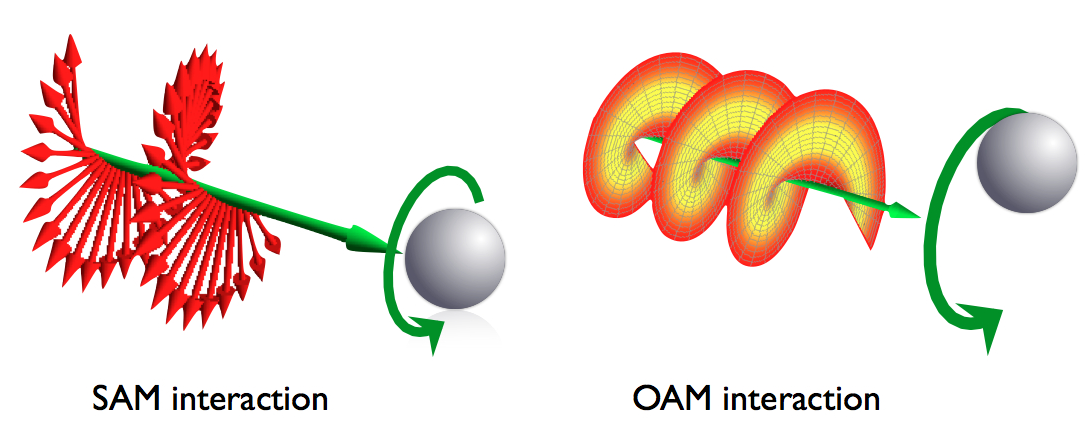
Spin and orbital angular momentum interaction with matter

When a light beam carrying nonzero angular momentum impinges on an absorbing particle, its angular momentum can be transferred on the particle, thus setting it in rotational motion. This occurs both with SAM and OAM. However, if the particle is not at the beam center the two angular momenta will give rise to different kinds of rotation of the particle. SAM will give rise to a rotation of the particle around its own center, i.e., to a particle spinning. OAM, instead, will generate a revolution of the particle around the beam axis. These phenomena are schematically illustrated in the figure.

In the case of transparent media, in the paraxial limit, the optical SAM is mainly exchanged with anisotropic systems, for example birefringent crystals. Indeed, thin slabs of birefringent crystals are commonly used to manipulate the light polarization. Whenever the polarization ellipticity is changed, in the process, there is an exchange of SAM between light and the crystal. If the crystal is free to rotate, it will do so. Otherwise, the SAM is finally transferred to the holder and to the Earth.

=== Spiral phase plate (SPP) ===
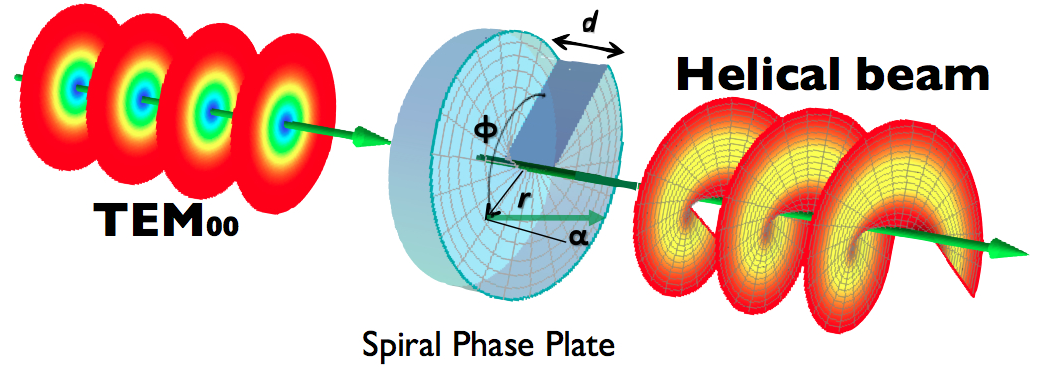
Schematic of generating light orbital angular momentum with spiral phase plate.

In the paraxial limit, the OAM of a light beam can be exchanged with material media that have a transverse spatial inhomogeneity. For example, a light beam can acquire OAM by crossing a spiral phase plate, with an inhomogeneous thickness (see figure).

=== Pitch-fork hologram ===
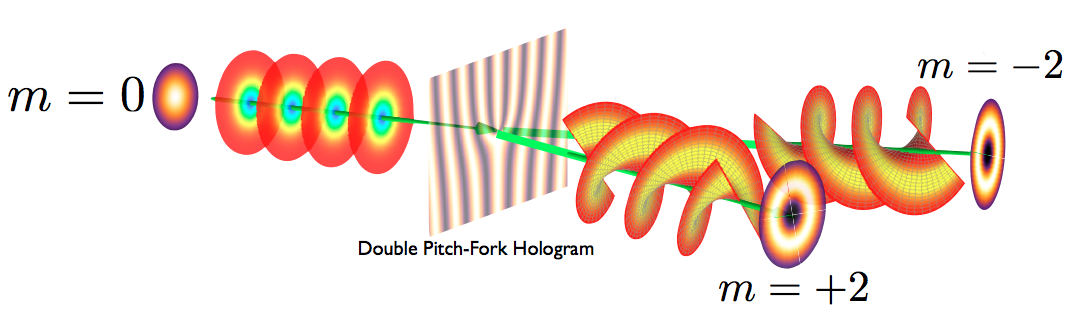
Schematic showing generation of orbital angular momentum of light in a Gaussian beam.

A more convenient approach for generating OAM is based on using diffraction on a fork-like or pitchfork hologram (see figure). Holograms can be also generated dynamically under the control of a computer by using a spatial light modulator. As a result, this allows one to obtain arbitrary values of the orbital angular momentum.

=== Q-plate ===
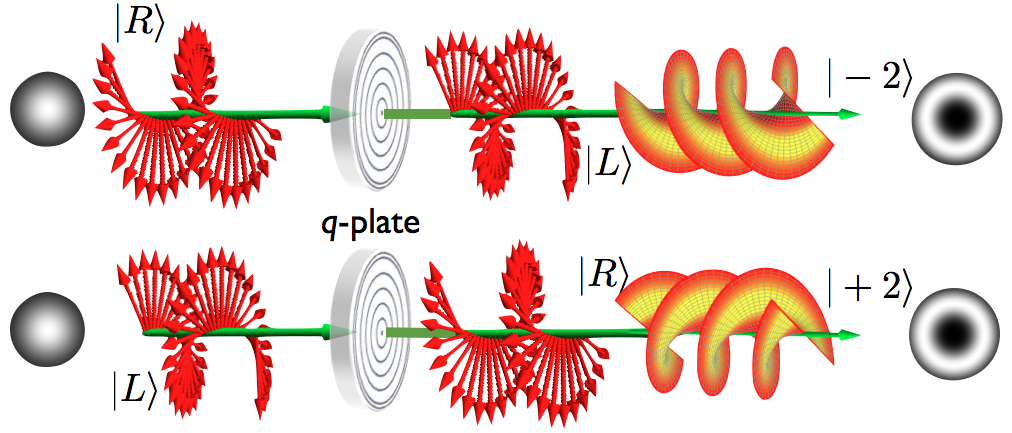
The q-plate effect for left and right-hand circular polarizations.

Another method for generating OAM is based on the SAM-OAM coupling that may occur in a medium which is both anisotropic and inhomogeneous. In particular, the so-called q-plate is a device, currently realized using liquid crystals, polymers or sub-wavelength gratings, which can generate OAM by exploiting a SAM sign-change. In this case, the OAM sign is controlled by the input polarization.

=== Cylindrical mode converters ===
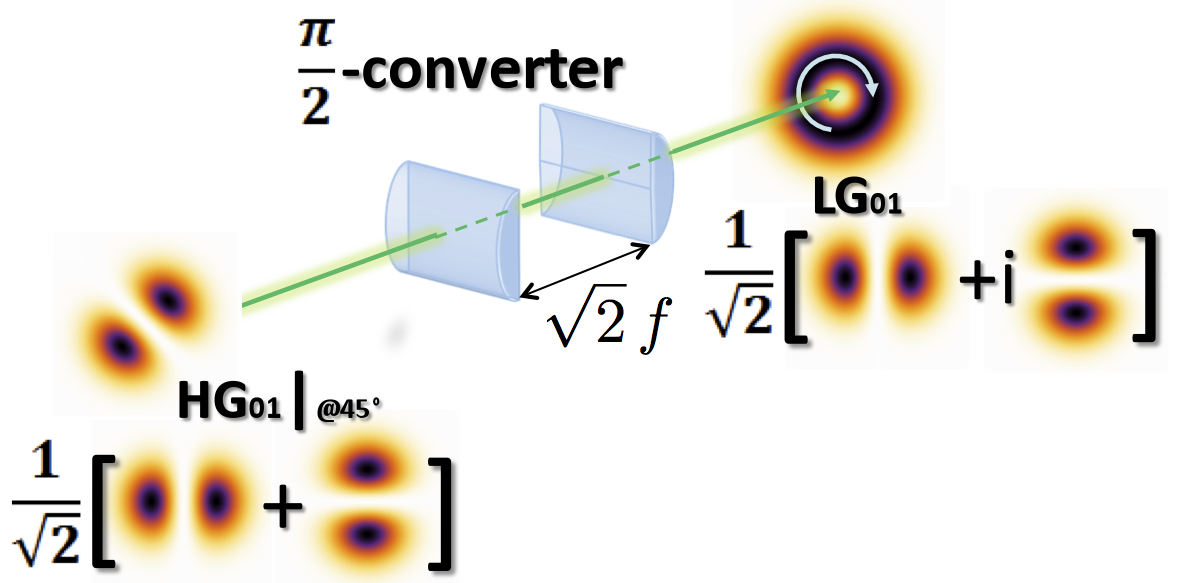
pi/2-cylindrical mode converter transforms HG mode into a proper LG mode.

OAM can also be generated by converting a Hermite-Gaussian beam into a Laguerre-Gaussian one by using an astigmatic system with two well-aligned cylindrical lenses placed at a specific distance (see figure) in order to introduce a well-defined relative phase between horizontal and vertical Hermite-Gaussian beams.

== Possible applications of the orbital angular momentum of light ==
The applications of the spin angular momentum of light are undistinguishable from the innumerable applications of the light polarization and will not be discussed here. The possible applications of the orbital angular momentum of light are instead currently the subject of research. In particular, the following applications have been already demonstrated in research laboratories, although they have not yet reached the stage of commercialization:

1. Orientational manipulation of particles or particle aggregates in optical tweezers
2. High-bandwidth information encoding in free-space optical communication
3. Higher-dimensional quantum information encoding, for possible future quantum cryptography or quantum computation applications
4. Sensitive optical detection

== Controversy: Non-existence of SAM and OAM of light ==
The decomposition of total angular momentum into spin and orbital parts for massless bosons—such as photons and gluons—has been a longstanding controversy in both classical and quantum field theory. Since the early days of quantum electrodynamics, physicists have debated whether the total angular momentum of light can be meaningfully separated into intrinsic spin and orbital angular momentum components. While such a decomposition is well-defined for massive particles using the Newton–Wigner position operator and related constructions, analogous definitions for massless particles have led to ambiguities, nonlocal expressions, or violations of Lorentz symmetry. In 2025, four rigorous no-go theorems were established that clarify the root of these issues. It was proved that it is mathematically impossible to construct operators that simultaneously satisfy the canonical angular momentum algebra, preserve Poincaré symmetry, and yield a physically meaningful spin–orbit decomposition for massless vector bosons. Any such attempt necessarily fails to commute with the Hamiltonian, violates Lorentz invariance, or leads to frame-dependent nonlocality. These results, grounded in the representation theory of the Poincaré group, explain why a consistent spin–orbit separation is fundamentally obstructed for massless gauge bosons. Nevertheless subsequent work has shown that helicity operators, which is not related to the angular momentum operator, can be used as alternatives.

== See also ==
- Angular momentum
- Circular polarization
- Electromagnetic wave
- Helmholtz equation
- Light
- Light orbital angular momentum
- Light spin angular momentum
- Optical vortices
- Orbital angular momentum multiplexing
- Polarization (waves)
- Photon polarization
