= Spin angular momentum (disambiguation) =

Spin angular momentum is a concept in classical mechanics.

It may refer to:

- Spin angular momentum of light, a property of electromagnetic waves
- A type of quantum-mechanical angular momentum operator
