= Jacquiline Romero =

Quantum physicist

Jacqui Romero
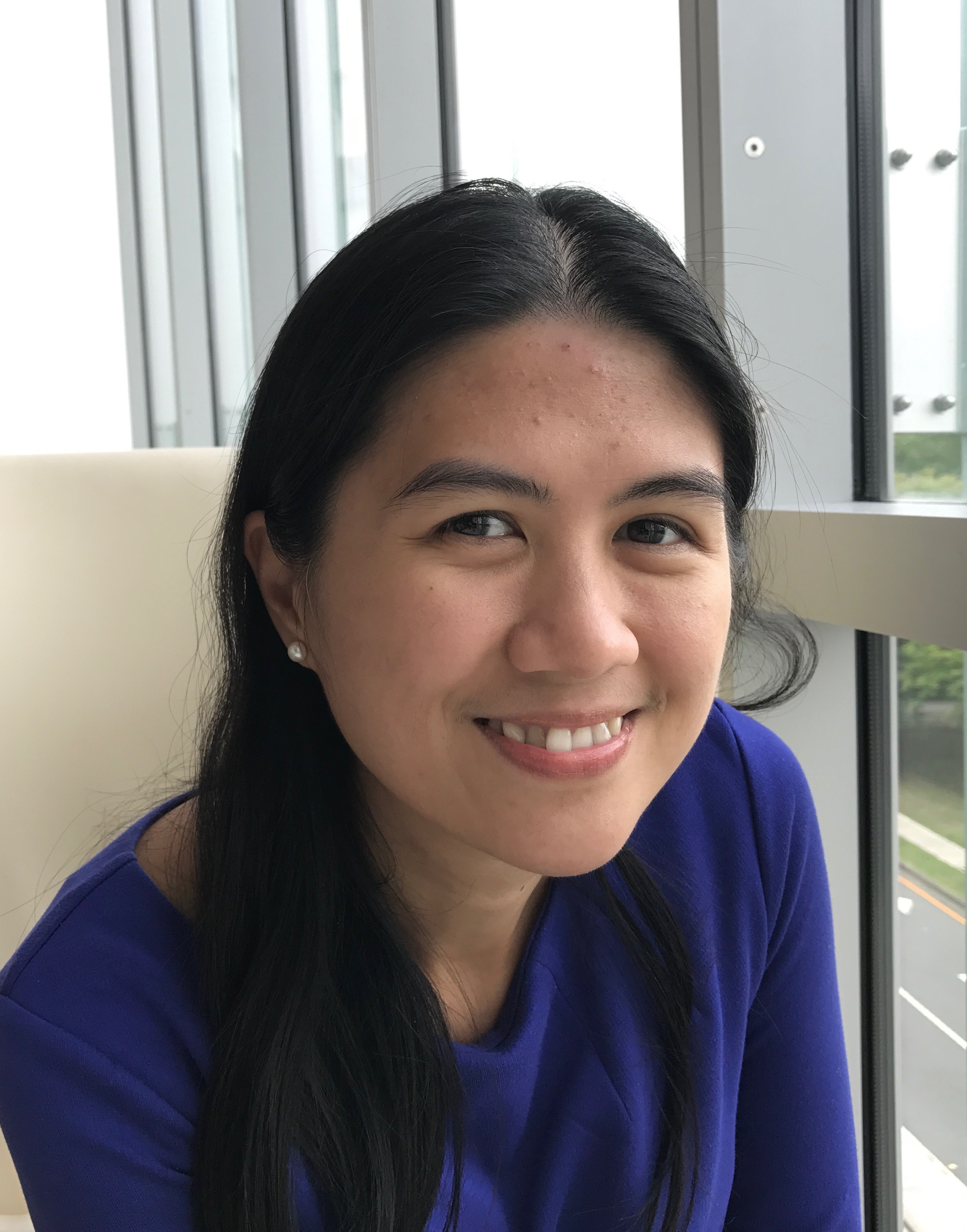
- Born: Mary Jacquiline Romero
- Education: Philippine Science High School
- Alma mater: University of the Philippines (BSc, MSc); University of Glasgow (PhD)
- Scientific career
- Fields: Optics; Quantum optics Entanglement; Orbital angular momentum
- Workplaces: University of the Philippines; University of Glasgow; University of Queensland
- Thesis: Orbital angular momentum entanglement (2012)
- Doctoral advisor: Miles J. Padgett; Stephen Barnett
- Website: researchers.uq.edu.au/researcher/12950

Mary Jacquiline Romero is a quantum physicist in the Australian Research Council Centre of Excellence for Engineered Quantum Systems at the University of Queensland, Australia. Her research expertise and interests are in the field of quantum foundations and quantum information. In particular, Romero is an experimental quantum physicist studying the properties of single photons for the development of new quantum alphabets and the nature of quantum causality. In 2025, Romero was elected an Optica Fellow and included in the International Year of Quantum Science and Technology's Quantum 100 List.

== Education ==
Romero attended Philippine Science High School, where she enjoyed physics the most out of her subjects. She completed a Bachelor of Science (Applied Physics) at the University of the Philippines in 2005. Following this she then completed her master's in physics in 2007 also at the University of the Philippines as a Philippine Council for Advanced Science and Technology Research and Development (PCASTRD) Scholar. Her Master's thesis was focussed on manipulating the shape of light for microscopy and microfabrication by using spatial light modulators (SLMs). Romero then left the Philippines and moved to the UK to do a PhD with Miles J. Padgett and Stephen Barnett at the University of Glasgow. Her PhD thesis explored the experimental and theoretical aspects of entanglement of spatial modes related to optical orbital angular momentum, extending the use of SLMs for the manipulation of single photons.

== Career and research ==
Following her PhD, Romero worked as a postdoctoral researcher at the University of Glasgow. During this time, Romero and her colleagues made headlines with their discovery of a way to slow down photons in free space. In 2015 she moved to Brisbane, Australia as a research fellow in the School of Mathematics and Physics at the University of Queensland. In 2016, Romero was awarded a Discovery Early Career Research Award (DECRA) to continue her work on quantum foundations and single photon manipulation, specifically studying security in higher-dimensional quantum systems. Romero's work on quantum alphabets seeks to increase the amount of information encoded in a single photon, as opposed to only two options (0 and 1) for encoding in classical computing. This research has implications for cyber security and more efficient data transfer and storage. Romero is also currently developing a brain-inspired computer based on current quantum photonic capabilities to provide insight for both neuroscience and computing.

=== Honours ===
- 2025 Optica Fellow
- 2025 Quantum 100 List
- 2019 Westpac Research Fellow
- 2019 L'Oréal-UNESCO For Women in Science program International Rising Talent Prize
- 2018 Ruby Payne-Scott medal from the Australian Institute of Physics
- 2018 UQ Early Career Researcher Award for Photonic neuromorphic computing
- 2018 Queensland Young Tall Poppy Award
- 2018 Japan Society for the Promotion of Science HOPE Fellowship
- 2017 L'Oréal-UNESCO For Women In Science Fellowship
- 2016 Discovery Early Career Research Award (DECRA)

=== Advocacy ===
Romero has been an advocate for women in science, emphasising the importance of role models for young women interested in physics. In interviews, Romero emphasises that it is possible to have a productive research career and have children (mother of 3 boys) saying, "I do not feel less of a physicist because I am a mother, nor less of a mother because I am a physicist"
