= Miles Padgett =

Professor of Optics

Miles Padgett OBE FRS FRSE FInstP
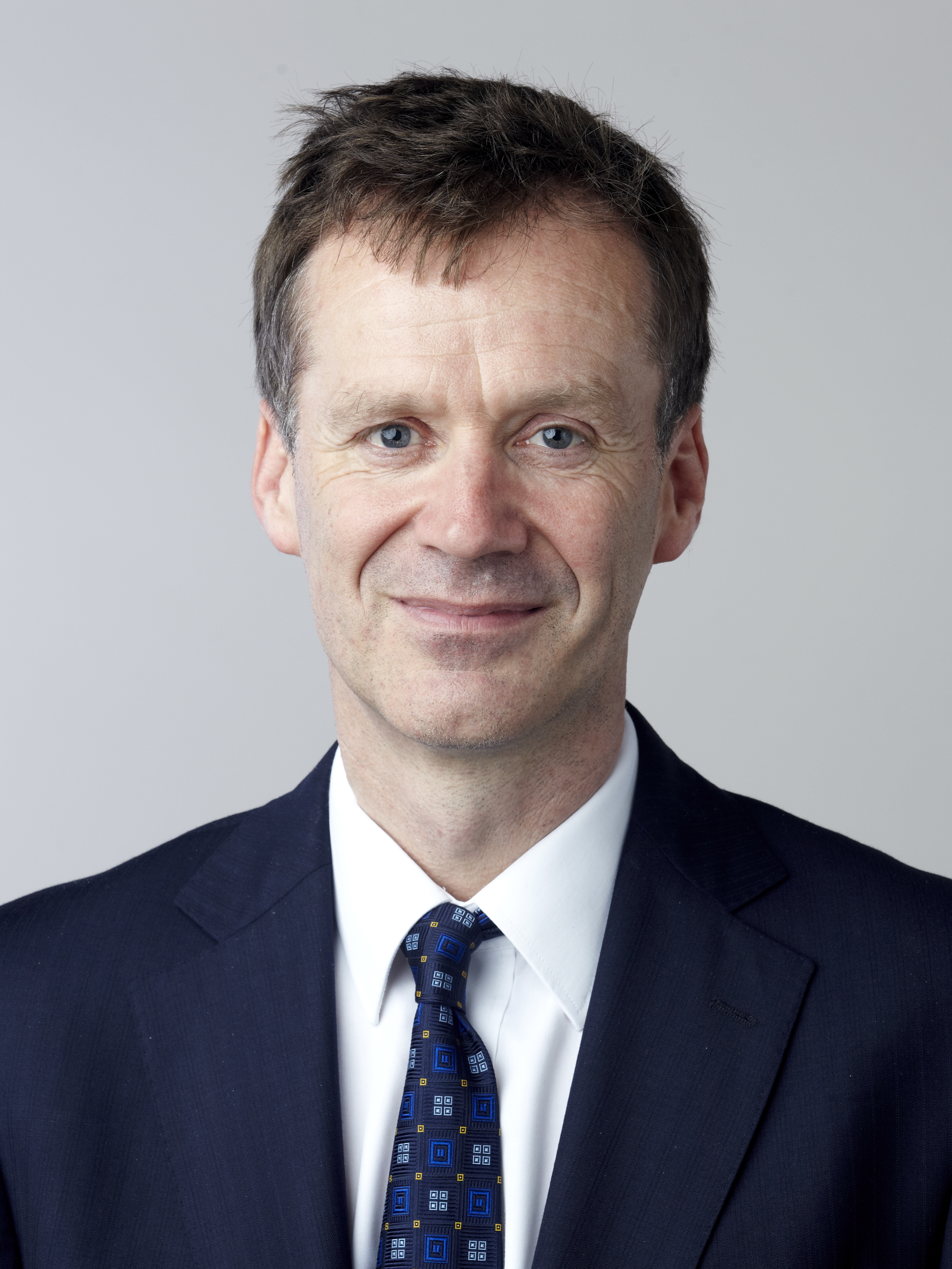
- Padgett in 2014
- Born: Miles John Padgett; 1 June 1963 (age 63)
- Education: University of Manchester; University of York (BSc); University of St Andrews (MSc); University of Cambridge (PhD)
- Known for: Optical angular momentum; Optical tweezers
- Spouse: Heather Reid (m. 2001)
- Awards: Young Medal (2009); Max Born Award (2017); Rumford Medal (2019)
- Scientific career
- Fields: Physics; Optics; Singular Optics; Optical Tweezers; Computational Imaging; Quantum Optics
- Workplaces: University of Glasgow
- Thesis: Techniques for ultra-high resolution saturation spectroscopy and laser stabilisation in the 10 μm spectral region (1988)
- Doctoral students: Jacqueline Romero
- Website: gla.ac.uk/schools/physics/staff/milespadgett

Miles John Padgett (born 1 June 1963) is a Royal Society Research Professor of Optics in the School of Physics and Astronomy at the University of Glasgow. He has held the Kelvin Chair of Natural Philosophy since 2011 and served as Vice Principal for research at Glasgow from 2014 to 2020.

== Education ==
Padgett was educated at the University of Manchester, the University of York, the University of St Andrews, and Trinity College, Cambridge, where he was awarded a PhD in 1988.

== Research and career ==
Working with Les Allen, Padgett conducted pioneering work on optical angular momentum, for which they were awarded 2009 the Young Medal. The research group he leads is best known for its work on the fundamental properties of light's angular momentum, including optical tweezers and optical spanners, the use of orbital angular momentum states to extend the alphabet of optical communication (with both classical and quantum light), and demonstrations of an angular form of the EPR paradox. Padgett's research has been published in leading peer-reviewed scientific journals including Science, Nature, Physical Review Letters, and Optics Express and Progress in Optics. Padgett's research has been funded by the Engineering and Physical Sciences Research Council (EPSRC).

=== Awards and honours ===
Padgett was elected a Fellow of the Royal Society of Edinburgh (FRSE) in 2001, in 2011 he was elected a Fellow of the Optical Society and in 2012 a Fellow of the Society of Photographic Instrumentation Engineers (SPIE). In 2014 he was elected a Fellow of the Royal Society (FRS) – the UK's National Academy of Science. His nomination for the Royal Society reads:

Padgett is internationally recognised for his leadership in the field of optics and in particular of optical momentum. His best known contributions include an optical spanner for spinning micron-sized objects, use of orbital angular momentum to increase the data capacity of communication systems and an angular form of the Einstein-Podolsky-Rosen (EPR) quantum paradox.

In 2009, with Les Allen, he won the Institute of Physics (IOP) Young Medal and in 2014 Padgett was awarded the Royal Society of Edinburgh's Lord Kelvin Medal. In 2015 he won the Science of Light Prize from the European Physical Society, in 2017 the Max Born Award of The Optical Society (OSA) and in 2019 the Rumford Medal of the Royal Society. Padgett is a Fellow of the Institute of Physics (FInstP).

Padgett was appointed Officer of the Order of the British Empire (OBE) in the 2020 Birthday Honours for services to scientific research and outreach.

== Personal life ==
As of 2021, Padgett resides in Glasgow with his wife Heather Reid and their daughter, Jenna.
