= Kingston, East Lothian =

Coordinates: 56.032°N 2.737°W

Kingston
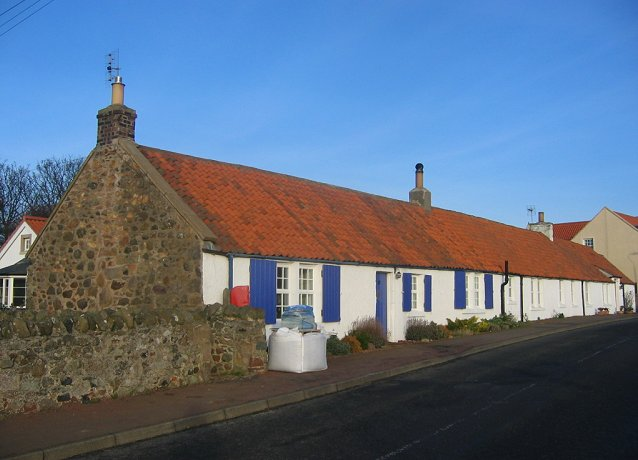
- Kingston

- Location within Scotland
- OS grid reference: NT541823
- Civil parish: Dirleton
- Council area: East Lothian Council
- Lieutenancy area: East Lothian
- Country: Scotland
- Sovereign state: United Kingdom
- Post town: NORTH BERWICK
- Postcode district: EH39
- Dialling code: 01620
- Police: Scotland
- Fire: Scottish
- Ambulance: Scottish
- UK Parliament: East Lothian
- Scottish Parliament: East Lothian

Kingston is a small hamlet near North Berwick in East Lothian, Scotland.

Kingston was once known as Kings Seat; historic maps of the area show this.

== Archaeology and Prehistory ==
In 2001, workmen excavating a pipe trench discovered human remains. CFA Archaeology was commissioned by Historic Scotland (now Historic Environment Scotland) to investigate. The subsequent excavations discovered a range of archaeological features - two prehistoric short-cists and thirty-eight early medieval long-cist burials. The medieval long cist was dated to the 6th-8th centuries AD. A stone with a Maltese cross was found, which may be related to the Knights Hospitaller, who were known to own land in the area in the 15th century AD.

== Fenton Tower ==
Fenton Tower in Kingston is a refurbished 16th century tower house. It retains the original footprint of the square keep, but now encompasses 7000 sq. ft. of living space over several levels. Fenton Tower was used as the location for Archie's castle in the BBC children's programme Balamory. The tower is depicted as being bright pink in the show, although in reality it is a more traditional off-white to Stone Grey colour, with the hue added in post-production.

Fenton Tower was built on the lands of 'Fentoun'. "During the reign of King David I of Scots (1124-1153) the lands of 'Fentoun' along with the lands of Gullane, Archerfield, Dirleton and Fidra island were all held by the Anglo-Norman De-vaux family who later gifted 'Fentoun' to their English kin the De-vauxs of Lanercost Priory. In the mid 12th century the De-vauxs built a 'castri' on the Fidra, a chapel at Gullane, a tower of 'Eilbote' at Archerfield (which must have been a place of some importance since King David signed a charter for the lands of Carberry witnessed at 'El bottle' ) and finally a stone castle at Dirleton itself during the reign of King Alexander II of Scots (1214-1249)"

James VI of Scotland visited several times, as a guest of Sir John Carmichael, who built the castle, which was described in January 1591 as 'a fair house' when Carmichael was having a dispute over the ownership of the site with the Laird of Innerwick. In May 1592 James stayed with his wife Anne of Denmark attended by his English servant Roger Aston.

Fenton Tower is a Category A listed building.

== Images ==
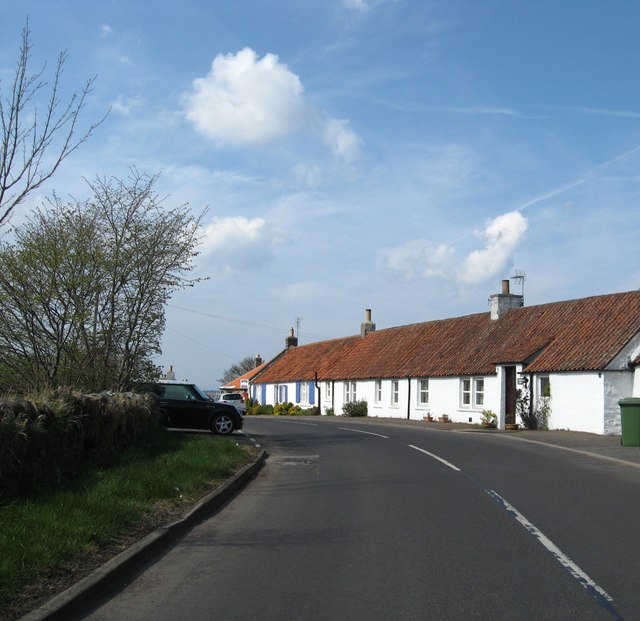
A row of white-washed cottages at Kingston

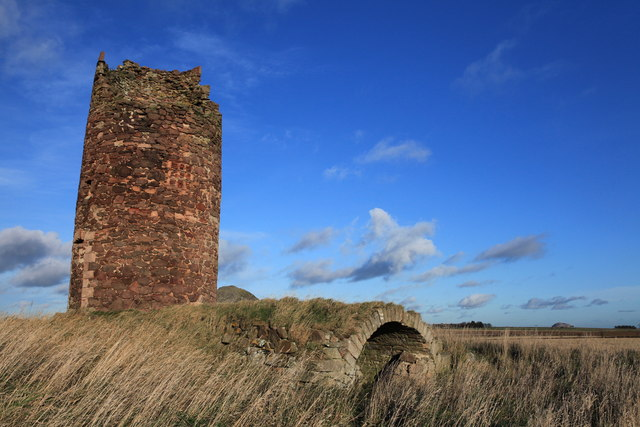
Balgone Windmill

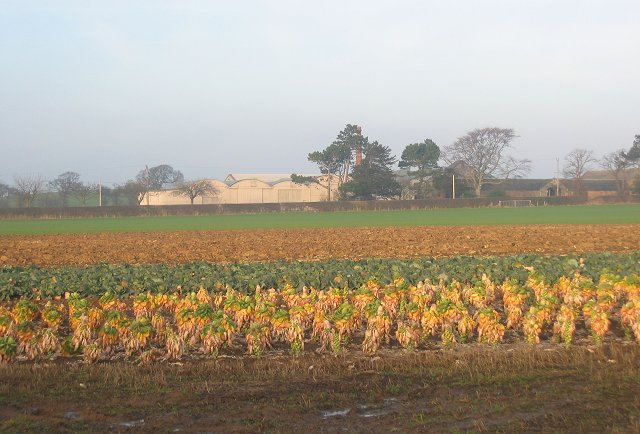
Kingston

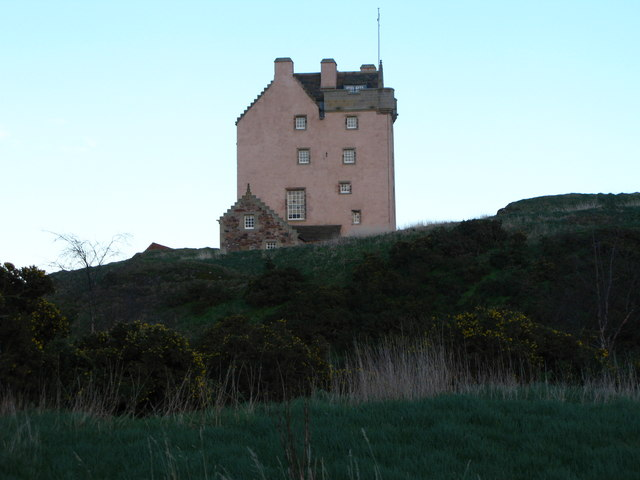
Fenton Tower

== Notable persons ==
- Sir John Carmichael (died 16 June 1600) Lord Warden of the Western Marches
- Prof Alan James Duncan FRSE (1938-1999) atomic physicist
- Prof Jamie A. Davies FRSE (1965- ) developmental biologist/ bioengineer.

== See also ==
- Restoration of castles in Scotland
