= Heather Reid =

British weather forecaster

Heather Reid OBE FIntP
- Born: 1969 (age 56–57); Paisley, Scotland
- Education: University of Edinburgh
- Spouse: Miles Padgett (m. 2001)
- Children: Jenna Padgett
- Awards: Public Awareness of Physics prize, Institute of Physics (2001); Kelvin Prize and Medal (2005) honorary doctorate, Paisley University (2003) honorary doctorate, University of Glasgow (2010)
- Scientific career
- Fields: meteorology science education
- Workplaces: Met Office; BBC; University of Glasgow

Heather Margaret Murray Reid OBE CPhys FInstP (born c. 1969), also known as "Heather the Weather", is a Scottish meteorologist, physicist, science communicator and educator. She was formerly a broadcaster and weather presenter for BBC Scotland.

== Career ==
Reid was born in Paisley. She graduated from the University of Edinburgh with an honours degree in physics followed by a master's degree in satellite image processing from the University's Meteorology Department. In 1993, Reid took a position at the UK Met Office working in satellite research. From 1994 to 2009 she worked as a weather presenter for BBC Scotland, presenting on Reporting Scotland. She became BBC Scotland's senior weather forecaster, and gave her final broadcast for Reporting Scotland on 22 December 2009. Reid now works as a science education consultant, and in the public promotion of science.

From 1999 to 2001 Reid was Chairperson of the Institute of Physics in Scotland, she has also served as a Council member and non-executive director of the Institute in London.

In the summer of 2006 Reid became a member of the Board of Trustees of Glasgow Science Centre, maintaining a connection that has seen her involved in various stages with the Centre, notably developing educational weather shows and workshops. She held the post for ten years.

Reid is a member of the Science and Engineering Education Advisory Group set up by the Scottish Government.

Most recently (2018) Reid was appointed by Scottish Government Ministers to the Board of Loch Lomond and the Trossachs National Park Authority and was elected Convener in Feb 2023. She was also appointed to the Board of NatureScot in 2021.

== Awards and honours ==
Reid has an honorary lectureship in the Physics and Astronomy Department at the University of Glasgow. In 2001 she was awarded the Public Awareness of Physics prize from the Institute of Physics for her science communication work, and in 2004 received the Institute's prestigious Kelvin Medal. In 2003 Reid received an honorary doctorate from Paisley University, and on 16 June 2010 she was awarded an honorary doctorate by the University of Glasgow. She also received an honorary doctorate from The Open University in 2015.

Reid was awarded an Order of the British Empire (OBE) for services to physics in the 2007 New Year Honours list, announced on 30 December 2006.

== Popular culture ==
Edinburgh band Randan Discothèque's 2010 single "Heather the Weather" is a homage to Reid.

== Personal life ==
Reid resides in Glasgow with her husband Miles Padgett, a professor of physics, and their daughter.
