= Orbital angular momentum multiplexing =

Optical multiplexing technique

Orbital angular momentum multiplexing is a physical layer method for multiplexing signals carried on electromagnetic waves using the orbital angular momentum (OAM) of the electromagnetic waves to distinguish between the different orthogonal signals.

OAM is one of two forms of angular momentum of light; it is distinct from, and should not be confused with, light spin angular momentum. The latter offers only two orthogonal quantum states, corresponding to the two states of circular polarization, and can be demonstrated to be equivalent to a combination of polarization multiplexing and phase shifting. OAM on the other hand relies on an extended beam of light, and the higher quantum degrees of freedom which come with the extension. OAM multiplexing can thus access a potentially unbounded set of states, and as such offer a much larger number of channels, subject only to the constraint of real-world optics. The constraint has been clarified in terms of independent scattering channels or the degrees of freedom of scattered fields through angular-spectral analysis, in conjunction with a rigorous Green's function method. The degrees of freedom limit is universal for arbitrary spatial-mode multiplexing, which is launched by a planar electromagnetic device, such as antenna, metasurface, etc., with a predefined physical aperture.

As of 2013, although OAM multiplexing promises very significant improvements in bandwidth when used in concert with other existing modulation and multiplexing schemes, it is still an experimental technique, and has so far only been demonstrated in the laboratory. Following the early claim that OAM exploits a new quantum mode of information propagation, the technique has become controversial, with numerous studies suggesting it can be modelled as a purely classical phenomenon by regarding it as a particular form of tightly modulated MIMO multiplexing strategy, obeying classical information theoretic bounds.

As of 2020, new evidence from radio telescope observations suggests that radio-frequency orbital angular momentum may have been observed in natural phenomena on astronomical scales, a phenomenon which is still under investigation.

== History ==
OAM multiplexing was demonstrated using light beams in free space as early as 2004. Since then, research into OAM has proceeded in two areas: radio frequency and optical transmission.

== Radio frequency ==
=== Terrestrial experiments ===
An experiment in 2011 demonstrated OAM multiplexing of two incoherent radio signals over a distance of 442 m. It has been claimed that OAM does not improve on what can be achieved with conventional linear-momentum based RF systems which already use MIMO, since theoretical work suggests that, at radio frequencies, conventional MIMO techniques can be shown to duplicate many of the linear-momentum properties of OAM-carrying radio beam, leaving little or no extra performance gain.

In November 2012, there were reports of disagreement about the basic theoretical concept of OAM multiplexing at radio frequencies between the research groups of Tamburini and Thide, and many different camps of communications engineers and physicists, with some declaring their belief that OAM multiplexing was just an implementation of MIMO, and others holding to their assertion that OAM multiplexing is a distinct, experimentally confirmed phenomenon.

In 2014, a group of researchers described an implementation of a communication link over 8 millimetre-wave channels multiplexed using a combination of OAM and polarization-mode multiplexing to achieve an aggregate bandwidth of 32 Gbit/s over a distance of 2.5 metres. These results agree well with predictions about severely limited distances made by Edfors et al.

The industrial interest for long-distance microwave OAM multiplexing seems to have been diminishing since 2015, when some of the original promoters of OAM-based communication at radio frequencies (including Siae Microelettronica) have published a theoretical investigation showing that there is no real gain beyond traditional spatial multiplexing in terms of capacity and overall antenna occupation.

=== Radio astronomy ===
In 2019, a letter published in the Monthly Notices of the Royal Astronomical Society presented evidence that OAM radio signals had been received from the vicinity of the M87* black hole, over 50 million light-years distant, suggesting that orbital angular momentum information can propagate over astronomical distances.

=== ISAC ===
OAM has recently been explored in the context of integrated sensing and communications (ISAC), where a single electromagnetic waveform is used for both data transmission and environmental sensing. OAM beams, characterized by their helical phase structure and orthogonal modal basis, enable multiplexing of multiple data streams while also producing spatially diverse field distributions that can probe targets. Recent experimental work has demonstrated that reconfiguring combinations of OAM modes can generate composite beam patterns whose reflections encode location-dependent information, enabling simultaneous high-rate communication and target localization in millimeter-wave systems. In parallel, studies in radar and antenna systems have examined the use of structured electromagnetic fields, including OAM modes, within joint radar–communication frameworks, highlighting their potential for enhanced parameter estimation and spatial diversity, while also noting that their performance is fundamentally tied to system geometry and shares similarities with conventional multiple-input multiple-output (MIMO) approaches.

== Optical ==
OAM multiplexing has been trialled in the optical domain. In 2012, researchers demonstrated OAM-multiplexed optical transmission speeds of up to 2.5 Tbits/s using 8 distinct OAM channels in a single beam of light, but only over a very short free-space path of roughly one metre. Work is ongoing on applying OAM techniques to long-range practical free-space optical communication links.

OAM multiplexing can not be implemented in the existing long-haul optical fiber systems, since these systems are based on single-mode fibers, which inherently do not support OAM states of light. Instead, few-mode or multi-mode fibers need to be used. Additional problem for OAM multiplexing implementation is caused by the mode coupling that is present in conventional fibers, which cause changes in the spin angular momentum of modes under normal conditions and changes in orbital angular momentum when fibers are bent or stressed. Because of this mode instability, direct-detection OAM multiplexing has not yet been realized in long-haul communications. In 2012, transmission of OAM states with 97% purity after 20 meters over special fibers was demonstrated by researchers at Boston University. Later experiments have shown stable propagation of these modes over distances of 50 meters, and further improvements of this distance are the subject of ongoing work. Other ongoing research on making OAM multiplexing work over future fibre-optic transmission systems includes the possibility of using similar techniques to those used to compensate mode rotation in optical polarization multiplexing.

Alternative to direct-detection OAM multiplexing is a computationally complex coherent-detection with (MIMO) digital signal processing (DSP) approach, that can be used to achieve long-haul communication, where strong mode coupling is suggested to be beneficial for coherent-detection-based systems.

In the beginning, people achieve OAM multiplexing by employing several phase plates or spatial light modulators. An on-chip OAM multiplexer was then an interest of research. In 2012, a paper by Tiehui Su and et al. demonstrated an integrated OAM multiplexer. Different solutions for integrated OAM multiplexer were demonstrated like Xinlun Cai with his paper in 2012. In 2019, Jan Markus Baumann and et al. designed a chip for OAM multiplexing.

=== Practical demonstration in optical-fiber system ===
A paper by Bozinovic et al. published in Science in 2013 claims the successful demonstration of an OAM-multiplexed fiber-optic transmission system over a 1.1 km test path. The test system was capable of using up to 4 different OAM channels simultaneously, using a fiber with a "vortex" refractive-index profile. They also demonstrated combined OAM and Wavelength-division multiplexing (WDM) using the same apparatus, but using only two OAM modes.

A paper by Kasper Ingerslev et al. published in Optics Express in 2018 demonstrates a MIMO-free transmission of 12 OAM modes over a 1.2 km air-core fiber. WDM compatibility of the system is shown by using 60, 25 GHz spaced WDM channels with 10 GBaud QPSK signals.

=== Practical demonstration in conventional optical-fiber systems ===
In 2014, articles by G. Milione et al. and H. Huang et al. claimed the first successful demonstration of an OAM-multiplexed fiber-optic transmission system over a 5 km of conventional optical fiber, i.e., an optical fiber having a circular core and a graded index profile. In contrast to the work of Bozinovic et al., which used a custom optical fiber that had a "vortex" refractive-index profile, the work by G. Milione et al. and H. Huang et al. showed that OAM multiplexing could be used in commercially available optical fibers by using digital MIMO post-processing to correct for mode mixing within the fiber. This method is sensitive to changes in the system that change the mixing of the modes during propagation, such as changes in the bending of the fiber, and requires substantial computation resources to scale up to larger numbers of independent modes, but shows great promise.

In 2018 Zengji Yue, Haoran Ren, Shibiao Wei, Jiao Lin & Min Gu at Royal Melbourne Institute of Technology miniaturised this technology, shrinking it from the size of a large dinner table to a small chip which could be integrated into communications networks. This chip could, they predict, increase the capacity of fibre-optic cables by at least 100-fold and likely higher as the technology is further developed.

== See also ==
- Angular momentum of light
- Optical vortex
- Polarization-division multiplexing
- Vorticity
- Wavelength-division multiplexing
