= Optical vortex =

Optical phenomenon

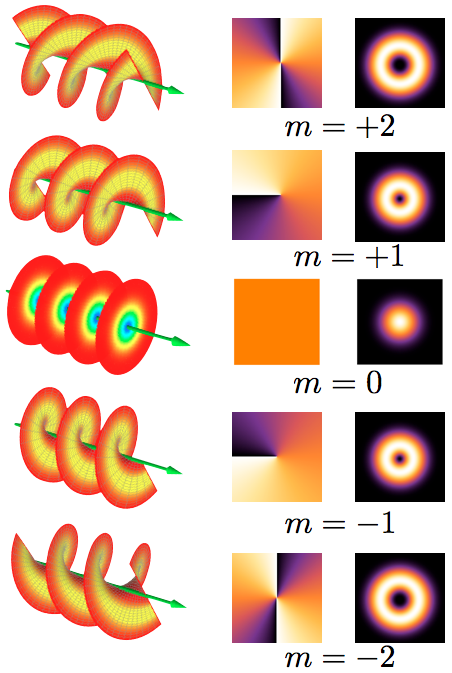
Diagram of different modes, four of which are optical vortices. Columns show the helical structures, phase-front and intensity of the beams

An optical vortex (also known as an optical phase singularity, photonic quantum vortex, or screw dislocation) is a zero of an optical field; a point of zero intensity. The term is also used to describe a beam of light that has such a zero in it. The study of these phenomena is known as singular optics.

The concept of "optical vortices" was first described by Coullet et al. in 1989, based on solutions of the Maxwell-Bloch equations. According to one review, studies in 1989-1999 mainly focused on fundamentals; studies in 1999-2009 developed many applications; and studies in 2009-2019 made a number of technological breakthroughs.

== Explanation ==
In an optical vortex, light is twisted like a corkscrew around its axis of travel. Because of the twisting, the light waves at the axis itself cancel each other out. When projected onto a flat surface, an optical vortex looks like a ring of light with a dark hole in the center. The vortex is given a number, called the topological charge, according to how many twists the light does in one wavelength. The number is always an integer, and can be positive or negative, depending on the direction of the twist. The higher the number of the twist, the faster the light is spinning around the axis.

This spinning carries orbital angular momentum with the wave train, and will induce torque on an electric dipole. Orbital angular momentum is distinct from the more commonly encountered spin angular momentum, which produces circular polarization. Orbital angular momentum of light can be observed in the orbiting motion of trapped particles. Interfering an optical vortex with a plane wave of light reveals the spiral phase as concentric spirals. The number of arms in the spiral equals the topological charge.

Optical vortices are studied by creating them in the lab in various ways. They can be generated directly in a laser, or a laser beam can be twisted into a vortex using any of several methods, such as computer-generated holograms, spiral-phase delay structures, or birefringent vortices in materials.

Importantly, spin and orbital angular momentum are not properly defined for photons. In the context of vortex beams, these terms correspond to different quantities. By contrast, the total angular momentum projection and helicity are suitable quantities to characterize beams even outside the paraxial approximation.

== Properties ==
A Laguerre-Gaussian beam is an optical vortex with a line singularity along the beam axis

An optical singularity is a zero of an optical field. The phase in the field circulates around these points of zero intensity (giving rise to the name vortex). Vortices are points in 2D fields and lines in 3D fields (as they have codimension two). Integrating the phase of the field around a path enclosing a vortex yields an integer multiple of 2π. This integer is known as the topological charge, or strength, of the vortex.

A hypergeometric-Gaussian mode (HyGG) has an optical vortex in its center. The beam, which has the form

$$\psi\propto  e^{im\phi} e^{-r^2},\!$$

is a solution to the paraxial wave equation (see paraxial approximation, and the Fourier optics article for the actual equation) consisting of the Bessel function. Photons in a hypergeometric-Gaussian beam have an orbital angular momentum of mħ. The integer m also gives the strength of the vortex at the beam's centre. Spin angular momentum of circularly polarized light can be converted into orbital angular momentum. Another important property of optical vortices is the transformation of their topological charge upon reflection, which depends on the type of reflecting surface.

=== Reflection of optical vortices ===
The behavior of the topological charge upon reflection depends on the type of reflection. According to numerical simulations based on scalar diffraction theory, a conventional mirror reflection reverses the sign of the topological charge (e.g., a vortex with $q = +1$ becomes $q = -1$). This is because the mirror reverses the spatial structure of the wavefront relative to the propagation axis, changing the handedness of the vortex. In contrast, phase-conjugate reflection (e.g., from stimulated Brillouin scattering media) restores the original topological charge. In this case, the wavefront is inverted twice, which preserves the initial orbital angular momentum.

== Creation ==
Methods of creating optical vortices work by taking a plane wave or Gaussian beam and increasing the phase of the wave at each by point $l \phi$, where $l$ is the orbital angular momentum of the beam and $\phi$ is the angle along the plane transverse to the direction of light propagation. Generation methods include spiral phase plates, holograms, spiral fresnel lenses, cylindrical lenses, spatial light modulators, and q-plates, as well as others.

- Static spiral phase plate(s) or mirror(s) are spiral-shaped pieces of crystal or plastic that are engineered specifically to the desired topological charge and incident wavelength. They are efficient, yet expensive. Adjustable spiral phase plates can be made by moving a wedge between two sides of a cracked piece of plastic. Off-axis spiral phase mirrors can be used to mode convert high-power and ultra-short lasers.
- Computer-generated holograms (CGHs) are the calculated interferogram between a plane wave and a Laguerre-Gaussian beam which is transferred to film. The CGH resembles a common Ronchi linear diffraction grating, save a "fork" dislocation. An incident laser beam creates a diffraction pattern with vortices whose topological charge increases with diffraction order. The zero order is Gaussian, and the vortices have opposite helicity on either side of this undiffracted beam. The number of prongs in the CGH fork is directly related to the topological charge of the first diffraction order vortex. The CGH can be blazed to direct more intensity into the first order. Bleaching transforms it from an intensity grating to a phase grating, which increases efficiency.

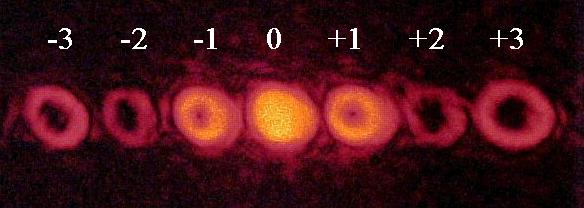
Vortices created by CGH

- Mode conversion requires Hermite-Gaussian (HG) modes, which can easily be made inside the laser cavity or externally by less accurate means. A pair of astigmatic lenses introduces a Gouy phase shift which creates an LG beam with azimuthal and radial indices dependent upon the input HG.
- A spatial light modulator is a computer-controlled electronic liquid-crystal device which can create dynamic vortices, arrays of vortices, and other types of beams by creating a hologram of varying refractive indices. This hologram may be a fork pattern, a spiral phase plate, or some similar pattern with non-zero topological charge.
- Deformable mirror made of segments can be used to dynamically (with a rate of up to a few kHz) create vortices, even if illuminated by high power lasers.
- A q-plate is a birefringent liquid crystal plate with an azimuthal distribution of the local optical axis, which has a topological charge q at its center defect. The q-plate with topological charge q can generate a $\pm 2q$ charge vortex based on the input beam polarization.
- An s-plate is a similar technology to a q-plate, using a high-intensity UV laser to permanently etch a birefringent pattern into silica glass with an azimuthal variation in the fast axis with topological charge of s. Unlike a q-plate, which may be wavelength tuned by adjusting the bias voltage on the liquid crystal, an s-plate only works for one wavelength of light.
- At radio frequencies it is trivial to produce a (non optical) electromagnetic vortex. Simply arrange a one wavelength or greater diameter ring of antennas such that the phase shift of the broadcast antennas varies an integral multiple of 2π around the ring.
- Nanophotonic metasurfaces can enable transverse phase modulation to create optical vortices. The vortex beams can be generated in either free space or on an integrated photonic chip.
- A spiral lens can "[incorporate] the elements necessary to make an optical vortex directly into its surface." Spiralizing a diopter can achieve multifocality, allowing—for instance in ophthalmic applications—increased acuity over a wide range of focal distances and light levels.

== Detection ==
An optical vortex, being fundamentally a phase structure, cannot be detected from its intensity profile alone. Furthermore, as vortex beams of the same order have roughly identical intensity profiles, they cannot be solely characterized from their intensity distributions. As a result, a wide range of interferometric techniques are employed.

An interference pattern of a vortex beam with an inclined plane wave, results in a fork-like interferogram

- The simplest of the techniques is to interfere a vortex beam with an inclined plane wave, which results in a fork-like interferogram. By making a count of the number of forks in the pattern and their relative orientations, the vortex order and its corresponding sign can be precisely estimated.
- A vortex beam can be deformed into its characteristic lobe structure while passing through a tilted lens. This happens as a result of a self-interference between different phase points in a vortex. A vortex beam of order l will be split into n = l + 1 lobes, roughly around the depth of focus of a tilted convex lens. Furthermore, the orientation of lobes (right and left diagonal), determine the positive and negative orbital angular momentum orders.
- A vortex beam generates a lobe structure when interfered with a vortex of opposite sign. This technique offers no mechanism to characterize the signs, however. This technique can be employed by placing a Dove prism in one of the paths of a Mach–Zehnder interferometer, pumped with a vortex profile.

== Applications ==
There are a broad variety of applications of optical vortices in diverse areas of communications and imaging.

- Extrasolar planets have only recently been directly detected, as their parent star is so bright. Progress has been made in creating an optical vortex coronagraph to directly observe planets with too low a contrast ratio to their parent to be observed with other techniques.
- Optical vortices are used in optical tweezers to manipulate micrometer-sized particles such as cells. Such particles can be rotated in orbits around the axis of the beam using OAM. Micro-motors have also been created using optical vortex tweezers.
- Optical vortices can significantly improve communication bandwidth. For instance, twisted radio beams could increase radio spectral efficiency by using the large number of vortical states. The amount of phase front 'twisting' indicates the orbital angular momentum state number, and beams with different orbital angular momentum are orthogonal. Such orbital angular momentum based multiplexing can potentially increase the system capacity and spectral efficiency of millimetre-wave wireless communication.
- Similarly, early experimental results for orbital angular momentum multiplexing in the optical domain have shown results over short distances, but longer distance demonstrations are still forthcoming. The main challenge that these demonstrations have faced is that conventional optical fibers change the spin angular momentum of vortices as they propagate, and may change the orbital angular momentum when bent or stressed. So far stable propagation of up to 50 meters has been demonstrated in specialty optical fibers. Free-space transmission of orbital angular momentum modes of light over a distance of 143 km has been demonstrated to be able to support encoding of information with good robustness.
- Current computers use electronics that have two states, zero and one. Quantum computing could use light to encode and store information. Optical vortices theoretically have an infinite number of states in free space, as there is no limit to the topological charge. This could allow for faster data manipulation. The cryptography community is also interested in optical vortices for the promise of higher bandwidth communication discussed above.
- In optical microscopy, optical vortices may be used to achieve spatial resolution beyond normal diffraction limits using a technique called Stimulated Emission Depletion (STED) Microscopy. This technique takes advantage of the low intensity at the singularity in the center of the beam to deplete the fluorophores around a desired area with a high-intensity optical vortex beam without depleting fluorophores in the desired target area.
- Optical vortices can be also directly (resonantly) transferred into polariton fluids of light and matter to study the dynamics of quantum vortices upon linear or nonlinear interaction regimes.
- Optical vortices can be identified in the non-local correlations of entangled photon pairs.

== See also ==
- Orbital angular momentum of light
