= Q-plate =

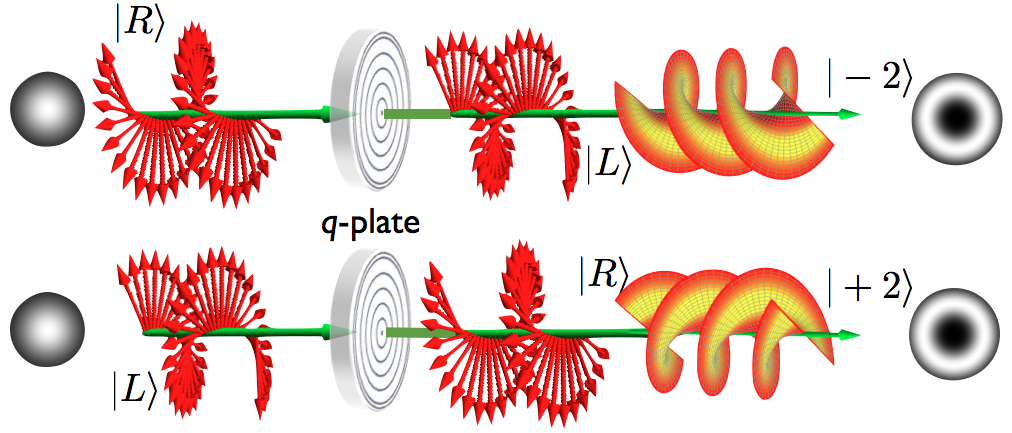
A q-plate can convert a right-polarized beam into a beam with an OAM of -2ħ, and a left-polarized beam into a +2ħ state.

A q-plate is an optical device that can form a light beam with orbital angular momentum (OAM) from a beam with well-defined spin angular momentum (SAM). Q-plates are based on the SAM-OAM coupling that may occur in media that are both anisotropic and inhomogeneous, such as an inhomogeneous anisotropic birefringent waveplate. Q-plates are also currently realized using total internal reflection devices, liquid crystals, metasurfaces based on polymers, and sub-wavelength gratings.

The sign of the OAM is controlled by the input beam's polarization.
