= Spin angular momentum of light =

Angular momentum deriving from photon spin

The spin angular momentum of light (SAM) is the component of angular momentum of light that is associated with the quantum spin and the rotation between the polarization degrees of freedom of the photon.

== Introduction ==
Spin is the fundamental property that distinguishes the two types of elementary particles: fermions, with half-integer spins; and bosons, with integer spins. Photons, which are the quanta of light, have been long recognized as spin-1 gauge bosons. The polarization of the light is commonly accepted as its "intrinsic" spin degree of freedom. However, in free space, only two transverse polarizations are allowed. Thus, the photon spin is always only connected to the two circular polarizations. To construct the full quantum spin operator of light, longitudinal polarized photon modes have to be introduced.

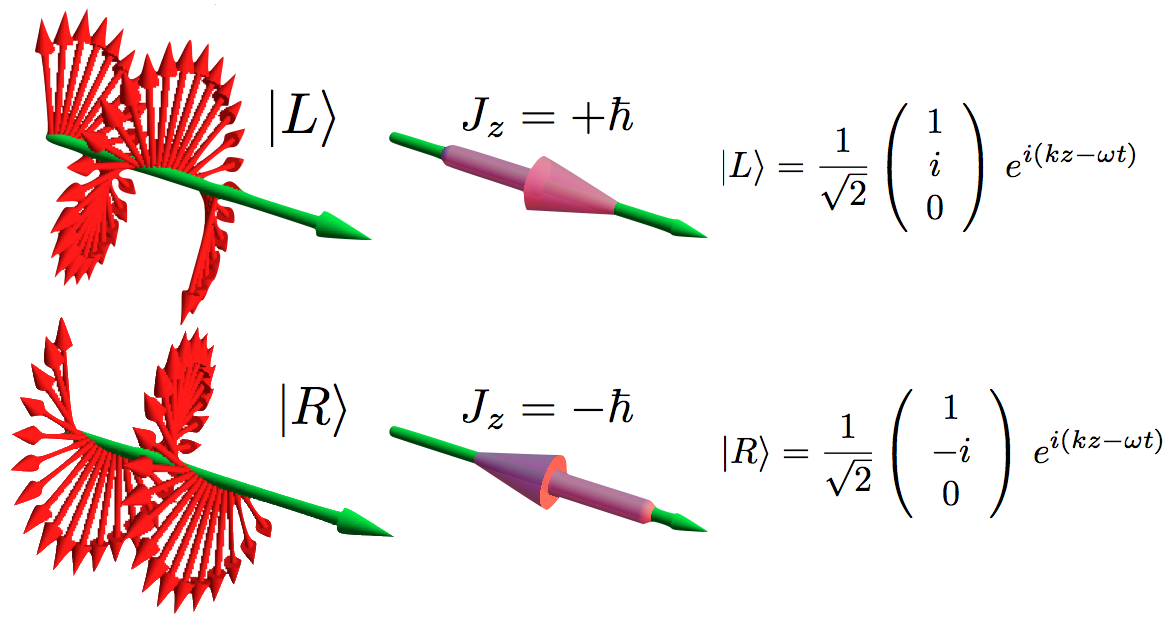
Left and right circular polarization and their associated angular momenta

An electromagnetic wave is said to have circular polarization when its electric and magnetic fields rotate continuously around the beam axis during propagation. The circular polarization is left ($\mathrm{L}$) or right ($\mathrm{R}$) depending on the field rotation direction and, according to the convention used, either from the point of view of the source, or the receiver. Both conventions are used in science, depending on the context.

When a light beam is circularly polarized, each of its photons carries a spin angular momentum (SAM) of $\pm\hbar$, where $\hbar$ is the reduced Planck constant and the $\pm$ sign is positive for left and negative for right circular polarizations (this is adopting the convention from the point of view of the receiver most commonly used in optics). This SAM is directed along the beam axis (parallel if positive, antiparallel if negative). The above figure shows the instantaneous structure of the electric field of left ($\mathrm{L}$) and right ($\mathrm{R}$) circularly polarized light in space. The green arrows indicate the propagation direction.

The mathematical expressions reported under the figures give the three electric-field components of a circularly polarized plane wave propagating in the $z$ direction, in complex notation.

== Mathematical expression ==
The general expression for the spin angular momentum is

$$\ \mathbf{S} = \frac{1}{c}\int \operatorname{d}^3\! x ~~ \mathbf{\tilde\pi} \times \mathbf{A}\ ,$$

where $\ c\$ is the speed of light in free space and $\ \mathbf{\tilde\pi}\$ is the conjugate canonical momentum of the vector potential $\ \mathbf{A} ~.$ The general expression for the orbital angular momentum of light is
$$\ \mathbf{L} = \frac{1}{c} \int \operatorname{d}^3\! x ~~ \tilde\pi^{\mu}\ \mathbf{x} \times \mathbf{\nabla} A_{\mu}\ ,$$
where $\mu=\{0,1,2,3\}$ denotes four indices of the spacetime and Einstein's summation convention has been applied.

To quantize light, the basic equal-time commutation relations have to be postulated,
$$\ [\ A^{\mu}( \mathbf{x}, t),\ \tilde\pi^{\nu}(\mathbf{x}',t)\ ]  = i\ \hbar\ c\ g^{\mu\nu}\ \delta^{3}(\mathbf{x} - \mathbf{x}')\ ,$$
$$\left[\ A^{\mu}(\mathbf{x},t),\ A^{\nu}(\mathbf{x}',t)\ \right] = \left[\ \tilde\pi^{\mu}(\mathbf{x},t),\ \tilde\pi^{\nu}(\mathbf{x}',t)\ \right] = 0\ ,$$
where $\hbar$ is the reduced Planck constant and $\ g^{\mu\nu} \equiv \mathrm{diag}\{ 1,-1,-1,-1 \}\$ is the metric tensor of the Minkowski space.

Then, one can verify that both $\ \mathbf{S}\$ and $\ \mathbf{L}\$ satisfy the canonical angular momentum commutation relations
$$[\ S_{i}, S_{j}\ ] = i\ \hbar\ \epsilon_{ijk}\ S_{k}\ ,$$
$$[\ L_{i}, L_{j}\ ] = i\ \hbar\ \epsilon_{ijk}\ L_{k}\ ,$$
and they commute with each other $\ [\ S_{i},L_{j}\ ] = 0 ~.$

After the plane-wave expansion, the photon spin can be re-expressed in a simple and intuitive form in the wave-vector space
$$\ \mathbf{S} = \hbar \int \operatorname{d}^3\!x ~~ \hat{\phi}^{\dagger}_{\mathbf{k}}\ \mathbf{\hat{s} }\ \hat{\phi}_{\mathbf{k}}\$$
where the vector $\ \hat{\phi}_{\mathbf{k}} \equiv \left(\ \hat{a}_{\mathbf{k},1},\ \hat{a}_{\mathbf{k},2},\ \hat{a}_{\mathbf{k},3}\ \right)\$ is the field operator of the photon in wave-vector space and the $\ 3\times 3\$ matrix
$$\ \mathbf{\hat{s}} = \sum_{j=1}^3\ \hat{s}_j\ \mathbf{\epsilon}(\mathbf{k},j)\$$
is the spin-1 operator of the photon with the SO(3) rotation generators
$$\hat{s}_1 = \begin{bmatrix}
0 & 0 & 0\\
0 & 0 & -i\\
0 & i & 0
\end{bmatrix}\ , \qquad \hat{s}_2 = \begin{bmatrix}
0 & 0 & i\\
0 & 0 & 0\\
-i & 0 & 0
\end{bmatrix}\ , \qquad \hat{s}_3 = \begin{bmatrix}
0 & -i & 0\\
i & 0 & 0\\
0 & 0 & 0
\end{bmatrix}\ ,$$
and the two unit vectors $\ \boldsymbol{\epsilon}(\mathbf{k},1)\cdot\mathbf{k} = \boldsymbol{\epsilon}(\mathbf{k},2) \cdot \mathbf{k} = 0\$ denote the two transverse polarizations of light in free space and unit vector $\ \boldsymbol{\epsilon}(\mathbf{k},3) = \frac{ \mathbf{k} }{ \left| \mathbf{k} \right| }\$ denotes the longitudinal polarization.

Due to the longitudinal polarized photon and scalar photon being involved, neither $\ \mathbf{S}\$ nor $\ \mathbf{L}\$ is gauge invariant. To incorporate the gauge invariance into the photon angular momenta, a re-decomposition of the total QED angular momentum and the Lorenz gauge condition has to be enforced. Finally, the direct observable part of spin and orbital angular momenta of light is given by
$$\ \mathbf{S}^{\mathrm obs} = i\ \hbar \int \operatorname{d}^3\! k ~~ \left(\hat{a}_{\mathbf{k},2}^{\dagger}\ \hat{a}_{\mathbf{k},1} - \hat{a}_{\mathbf{k},1}^{\dagger}\ \hat{a}_{\mathbf{k},2} \right)\ \frac{ \mathbf{k} }{ \left| \mathbf{k}\right| } = \varepsilon_{0} \int \operatorname{d}^3\! x ~~ \mathbf{E}_{\perp} \times \mathbf{A}_{\perp}\ ,$$
and
$$\ \mathbf{L}^{\mathrm obs}_{M} = \varepsilon_{0} \int \operatorname{d}^3\! x ~~ E_{\perp}^{j}\ \mathbf{x} \times \mathbf{\nabla}A_{\perp}^{j}\$$
which recovers the angular momenta of classical transverse light. Here, $\ \mathbf{E}_{\perp}\$ is the transverse part of the electric field, similarly $\ \mathbf{A}_{\perp}\$ is the transverse vector potential, and $\ \varepsilon_0\$ is the vacuum permittivity. The equations are written for SI units.

We can define the annihilation operators for circularly polarized transverse photons:
$$\ \hat{a}_{\mathbf{k}, \mathrm{L}} = \frac{1}{\sqrt{2\ } } \left( \hat{a}_{\mathbf{k},1} - i\ \hat{a}_{\mathbf{k},2} \right)\ ,$$
$$\ \hat{a}_{\mathbf{k},\mathrm{R}} = \frac{1}{\sqrt{2\ } } \left( \hat{a}_{\mathbf{k},1} + i\ \hat{a}_{\mathbf{k},2} \right)\ ,$$
with polarization unit vectors
$$\ \mathbf{e}( \mathbf{k}, \mathrm{L} ) = \frac{1}{\sqrt{2\ } } \left[\ \mathbf{e}(\mathbf{k},1) + i\ \mathbf{e}(\mathbf{k},2)\ \right]\ ,$$
$$\ \mathbf{e}(\mathbf{k},\mathrm{R}) = \frac{1}{\sqrt{2\ }} \left[\ \mathbf{e}(\mathbf{k},1) - i\ \mathbf{e}(\mathbf{k},2)\ \right] ~.$$

Then, the transverse-field photon spin can be re-expressed as
$$\ \mathbf{S}^{\mathrm obs} = \int \operatorname{d}^3\! k ~~ \hbar\ \left(\ \hat{a}^\dagger_{\mathbf{k},L}\ \hat{a}_{\mathbf{k},L} - \hat{a}^\dagger_{\mathbf{k},R}\ \hat{a}_{\mathbf{k},R}\ \right)\ \frac{ \mathbf{k} }{ \left|\mathbf{k}\right| }\ ,$$

For a single plane-wave photon, the spin can only have two values $\ \pm\hbar\ ,$ which are eigenvalues of the spin operator $\ \hat{s}_3 ~.$ The corresponding eigenfunctions describing photons with well-defined values of SAM are described as circularly polarized waves:
$$\ \left| \pm \right\rangle = \begin{pmatrix} 1 \\ \pm i \\ 0 \end{pmatrix} ~.$$

== Obstructions to the existence of SAM and OAM of light ==
The decomposition of total angular momentum into spin and orbital parts for massless bosons—such as photons and gluons—has been a longstanding controversy in both classical and quantum field theory. Since the early days of quantum electrodynamics, physicists have debated whether the total angular momentum of light can be meaningfully separated into intrinsic spin and orbital angular momentum components. While such a decomposition is well-defined for massive particles using the Newton–Wigner position operator and related constructions, analogous definitions for massless particles have led to ambiguities, nonlocal expressions, or violations of Lorentz symmetry. In 2025, four rigorous no-go theorems were established that clarify the root of these issues. It was proved that it is mathematically impossible to construct operators that simultaneously satisfy the canonical angular momentum algebra, preserve Poincaré symmetry, and yield a physically meaningful spin–orbit decomposition for massless vector bosons. Any such attempt necessarily fails to commute with the Hamiltonian, violates Lorentz invariance, or leads to frame-dependent nonlocality. These results, grounded in the representation theory of the Poincaré group, explain why a consistent spin–orbit separation is fundamentally obstructed for massless gauge bosons.

== See also ==
- Helmholtz equation
- Orbital angular momentum of light
- Polarization (physics)
- Photon polarization
- Spin polarization
