= Orbital angular momentum of light =

Type of angular momentum in light

A focused vortex beam exhibiting orbital angular momentum via the helical wavefronts

The orbital angular momentum of light (OAM) is the component of angular momentum of a light beam that is dependent on the field spatial distribution, and not on the polarization. OAM can be split into two types. The internal OAM is an origin-independent angular momentum of a light beam that can be associated with a helical or twisted wavefront. The external OAM is the origin-dependent angular momentum that can be obtained as cross product of the light beam position (center of the beam) and its total linear momentum. While widely used in laser optics, there is no unique decomposition of spin and orbital angular momentum of light.

== Concept ==
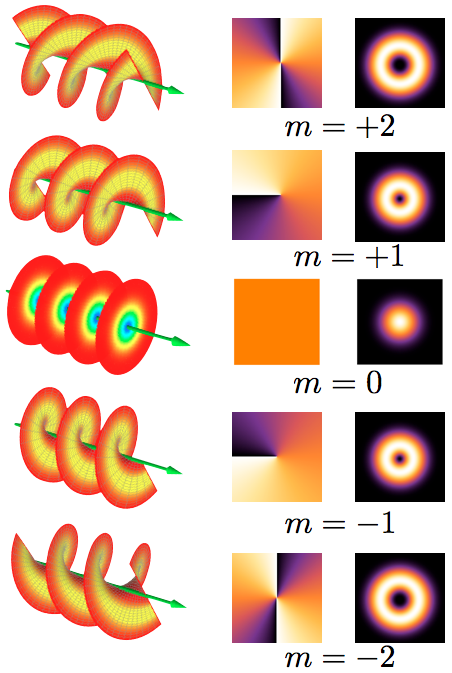
Different columns show the beam helical structures, phase fronts, and corresponding intensity distributions.

A beam of light carries a linear momentum $\mathbf{P}$, and hence it can be also attributed an external angular momentum $\mathbf{L}_e=\mathbf{r}\times\mathbf{P}$. This external angular momentum depends on the choice of the origin of the coordinate system. If one chooses the origin at the beam axis and the beam is cylindrically symmetric (at least in its momentum distribution), the external angular momentum will vanish. The external angular momentum is a form of OAM, because it is unrelated to polarization and depends on the spatial distribution of the optical field (E).

A more interesting example of OAM is the internal OAM appearing when a paraxial light beam is in a so-called "helical mode". Helical modes of the electromagnetic field are characterized by a wavefront that is shaped as a helix, with an optical vortex in the center, at the beam axis (see figure). If the phase varies around the axis of such a wave, it carries orbital angular momentum.

In the figure to the right, the first column shows the beam wavefront shape. The second column is the optical phase distribution in a beam cross-section, shown in false colors. The third column is the light intensity distribution in a beam cross-section (with a dark vortex core at the center).

The helical modes are characterized by an integer number $m$, positive or negative. If $m=0$, the mode is not helical and the wavefronts are multiple disconnected surfaces, for example, a sequence of parallel planes (from which the name "plane wave"). If $m=\pm 1$, the handedness determined by the sign of $m$, the wavefront is shaped as a single helical surface, with a step length equal to the wavelength $\lambda$. If $|m|\geqslant 2$, the wavefront is composed of $|m|$ distinct but intertwined helices, with the step length of each helix surface equal to $|m|\lambda$, and a handedness given by the sign of $m$. The integer $m$ is also the so-called "topological charge" of the optical vortex. Light beams that are in a helical mode carry nonzero OAM. As an example, any Laguerre-Gaussian mode with rotational mode number $l \ne 0$ has such a helical wavefront.

== Formulation ==
The classical expression of the orbital angular momentum is the following:
$$\mathbf{L} = \epsilon_0 \sum_{i=x,y,z} \int \left(E^i\left(\mathbf{r} \times \boldsymbol{\nabla}\right) A^i\right)d^3\mathbf{r} ,$$
where $\mathbf{E}$ and $\mathbf{A}$ are the electric field and the vector potential, respectively, $\epsilon_0$ is the vacuum permittivity and we are using SI units. The $i$-superscripted symbols denote the cartesian components of the corresponding vectors.

For a monochromatic wave this expression can be transformed into the following one:
$$\mathbf{L}=\frac{\epsilon_0}{2i\omega}\sum_{i=x,y,z} \int \left({E^i}^{\ast}\left(\mathbf{r}\times\mathbf{\nabla}\right) E^i\right) d^3\mathbf{r} .$$

This expression is generally nonvanishing when the wave is not cylindrically symmetric. In particular, in a quantum theory, individual photons may have the following values of the OAM:
$$\mathbf{L}_z = m\hbar .$$
where the topological charge $m$ can be extracted numerically from electric field profile of vortex beams.

The corresponding wave functions (eigenfunctions of OAM operator) have the following general expression:
$$\langle \mathbf{r}|m\rangle\propto e^{i m \phi} .$$
where $\phi$ is the cylindrical coordinate. As mentioned in the Introduction, this expression corresponds to waves having a helical wavefront (see figure above), with an optical vortex in the center, at the beam axis.

== Controversy on definitions SAM and OAM of light ==
The decomposition of total angular momentum into spin and orbital parts for massless bosons—such as photons and gluons—has been a longstanding controversy in both classical and quantum field theory. While such a decomposition is well-defined for massive particles, many different SAM and OAM operators have been defined for light and all of these have been shown to be inconsistent with fundamental requirements. Starting with the operators for a massive particle, the limit of zero mass is obstructed by a topological singularity. This obstruction seems to fundamentally prevent decomposition of the angular momentum of light. Helicity operators can be used as alternatives.

== Generation ==
A light beam with a given orbital angular momentum (OAM) can be generated by letting a standard Gaussian beam impinge on a display of a spatial light modulator (SLM). If the phase profile on SLM is flat, the SLM works effectively as a mirror. If the phase has a helical profile, the resulting beam is a Laguerre-Gaussian (LG) beam with a well-defined OAM. In real applications, there is a non-negligible admixture in the reflected beam in the form of a Gaussian beam. One can get rid of it by superposing the helical phase on the SLM with a diffraction grating.

Orbital angular momentum states with $l = \pm 1$ occur naturally. OAM states of arbitrary $l$ can be created artificially using a variety of tools, such as using spiral phase plates, spatial light modulators and q-plates.

Spiral wave plates, made of plastic or glass, are plates where the thickness of the material increases in a spiral pattern in order to imprint a phase gradient on light passing through it. For a given wavelength, an OAM state of a given $l$ requires that the step height —the height between the thinnest and thickest parts of the plate— be given by $s = l\lambda/(n-1)$ where $n$ is the refractive index of the plate. Although the wave plates themselves are efficient, they are relatively expensive to produce, and are, in general, not adjustable to different wavelengths of light.

Another way to modify the phase of the light is with a diffraction grating. For an $l=0$ state, the diffraction grating would consist of parallel lines. However, for an $l=1$ state, there will be a "fork" dislocation, and the number of lines above the dislocation will be one larger than below. An OAM state with $l>1$ can be created by increasing the difference in the number of lines above and below the dislocation. As with the spiral wave plates, these diffraction gratings are fixed for $l$, but are not restricted to a particular wavelength.

A spatial light modulator operates in a similar way to diffraction gratings, but can be controlled by computer to dynamically generate a wide range of OAM states.

=== Recent advances ===
Theoretical work suggests that a series of optically distinct chromophores are capable of supporting an excitonic state whose symmetry is such that in the course of the exciton relaxing, a radiation mode of non-zero topological charge is created directly.

Most recently, the geometric phase concept has been adopted for OAM generation. The geometric phase is modulated to coincide with the spatial phase dependence factor, i.e., $e^{i m \phi}$ of an OAM carrying wave. In this way, geometric phase is introduced by using anisotropic scatterers. For example, a metamaterial composed of distributed linear polarizers in a rotational symmetric manner generates an OAM of order 1. To generate higher-order OAM wave, nano-antennas which can produce the spin-orbit coupling effect are designed and then arranged to form a metasurface with different topological charges. Consequently, the transmitted wave carries an OAM, and its order is twice the value of the topological charge. Usually, the conversion efficiency is not high for the transmission-type metasurface. Alternative solution to achieve high transmittance is to use complementary (Babinet-inverted) metasurface. On the other hand, it is much easier to achieve high conversion efficiency, even 100% efficiency in the reflection-type metasurface such as the composite PEC-PMC metasurface.

Beside OAM generation in free space, integrated photonic approaches can also realize on-chip optical vortices carrying OAM. Representative approaches include patterned ring resonators, subwavelength holographic gratings, Non-Hermitian vortex lasers, and meta-waveguide OAM emitters.

== Measurement ==
Determining the spin angular momentum (SAM) of light is simple – SAM is related to the polarization state of the light: the AM is, per photon, in a left and right circularly polarized beam respectively. Thus the SAM can be measured by transforming the circular polarization of light into a p- or s-polarized state by means of a wave plate and then using a polarizing beam splitter that will transmit or reflect the state of light.

The development of a simple and reliable method for the measurement of orbital angular momentum (OAM) of light, however, remains an important problem in the field of light manipulation. OAM (per photon) arises from the amplitude cross-section of the beam and is therefore independent of the spin angular momentum: whereas SAM has only two orthogonal states, the OAM is described by a state that can take any integer value N. As the state of OAM of light is unbounded, any integer value of l is orthogonal to (independent from) all the others. Where a beam splitter could separate the two states of SAM, no device can separate the N (if greater than 2) modes of OAM, and, clearly, the perfect detection of all N potential states is required to finally resolve the issue of measuring OAM. Nevertheless, some methods have been investigated for the measurement of OAM.

In practical scenarios, light beams carrying orbital angular momentum (OAM) are often not composed of a single pure mode due to distortions caused by atmospheric turbulence, optical misalignment, or scattering. These imperfections result in a superposition of multiple OAM modes within the beam. Measuring the OAM spectrum is essential to quantify the modal composition and assess the beam's quality, which is critical for applications such as optical communications, imaging, and quantum information processing.

To determine the vortex mode spectrum, one common method involves decomposing the complex optical field into its constituent angular harmonics: For a scalar complex field expressed in polar coordinates, this decomposition is:

$u(\rho, \phi, z) = \frac{1}{\sqrt{2\pi}} \sum_{l=-\infty}^{\infty} a_l(\rho, z) \exp(i l \phi),$

where the summation runs over all integer OAM modes $l$. This decomposition requires knowledge of both the amplitude and phase of the field. While direct phase measurement is challenging, phase retrieval algorithms — particularly single-beam multiple-image reconstruction (SBMIR) methods — enable reliable recovery of the phase profile from intensity measurements alone, achieving high resolution without auxiliary reference beams.

The coefficients $a_l(\rho, z)$, representing the amplitude of each mode, are obtained by projecting the field onto the corresponding angular harmonic:

$a_l(\rho, z) = \frac{1}{\sqrt{2\pi}} \int_{0}^{2\pi} u(\rho, \phi, z) \exp(-i l \phi)d\phi.$

The normalized intensity (or power) of each OAM mode $l$ at a propagation distance $z$ is then calculated by integrating the squared modulus of $a_l$ over the radial coordinate $\rho$:

$P_l(z) = \frac{\int_{0}^{\infty} |a_l(\rho, z)|^2 \rho d\rho}{\sum_{l'=-\infty}^{\infty} \int_{0}^{\infty} |a_{l}(\rho, z)|^2 \rho d\rho}.$

Here, the denominator ensures normalization by the total power across all modes, making $P_l(z)$ a dimensionless fraction between 0 and 1. This spectrum provides a direct measure of the beam's OAM purity and mode distribution.

=== Counting spiral fringes ===
Beams carrying OAM have a helical phase structure. Interfering such a beam with a uniform plane wave reveals phase information about the input beam through analysis of the observed spiral fringes. In a Mach–Zender interferometer, a helically phased source beam is made to interfere with a plane-wave reference beam along a collinear path. Interference fringes will be observed in the plane of the beam waist and/or at the Rayleigh range. The path being collinear, these fringes are pure consequence of the relative phase structure of the source beam. Each fringe in the pattern corresponds to one step through: counting the fringes suffices to determine the value of l.

=== Diffractive holographic filters ===
Computer-generated holograms can be used to generate beams containing phase singularities, and these have now become a standard tool for the generation of beams carrying OAM. This generating method can be reversed: the hologram, coupled to a single-mode fiber of set entrance aperture, becomes a filter for OAM. This approach is widely used for the detection of OAM at the single-photon level.

The phase of these optical elements results to be the superposition of several fork-holograms carrying topological charges selected in the set of values to be demultiplexed. The position of the channels in far-field can be controlled by multiplying each fork-hologram contribution to the corresponding spatial frequency carrier.

=== Other methods ===
Other methods to measure the OAM of light include the rotational Doppler effect, systems based on a Dove prism interferometer, the measure of the spin of trapped particles, the study of diffraction effects from apertures, and optical transformations. The latter use diffractive optical elements in order to unwrap the angular phase patterns of OAM modes into plane-wave phase patterns which can subsequently be resolved in the Fourier space. The resolution of such schemes can be improved by spiral transformations that extend the phase range of the output strip-shaped modes by the number of spirals in the input beamwidth.

== Applications ==
=== Potential use in telecommunications ===
Research into OAM has suggested that light waves could carry hitherto unprecedented quantities of data through optical fibres. According to preliminary tests, data streams travelling along a beam of light split into 8 different circular polarities have demonstrated the capacity to transfer up to 2.5 terabits of data (equivalent to 66 DVDs or 320 gigabytes) per second. Further research into OAM multiplexing in the radio and mm wavelength frequencies has been shown in preliminary tests to be able to transmit 32 gigabits of data per second over the air. The fundamental communication limit of orbital-angular-momentum multiplexing is increasingly urgent for current multiple-input multiple-output (MIMO) research. The limit has been clarified in terms of independent scattering channels or the degrees of freedom (DoF) of scattered fields through angular-spectral analysis, in conjunction with a rigorous Green function method. The DoF limit is universal for arbitrary spatial-mode multiplexing, which is launched by a planar electromagnetic device, such as antenna, metasurface, etc., with a predefined physical aperture.

=== Quantum-information applications ===
OAM states can be generated in coherent superpositions and they can be entangled, which is an integral element of schemes for quantum information protocols. Photon pairs generated by the process of parametric down-conversion are naturally entangled in OAM, and correlations measured using spatial light modulators (SLM).

Using qudits (with d levels, as opposed to a qubit's 2 levels) has been shown to improve the robustness of quantum key distribution schemes. OAM states provide a suitable physical realisation of such a system, and a proof-of-principle experiment (with 7 OAM modes from $l = -3$ to $l = 3$) has been demonstrated.

=== Radio astronomy ===
In 2019, a letter published in the Monthly Notices of the Royal Astronomical Society presented evidence that OAM radio signals had been received from the vicinity of the M87* black hole, over 50 million light years distant, suggesting that optical angular momentum information can propagate over astronomical distances.

=== Integrated sensing and communications ===
OAM has potential application in integrated sensing and communications (ISAC), where a single electromagnetic waveform is used for both data transmission and environmental sensing. OAM beams, characterized by their helical phase structure and orthogonal modal basis, enable multiplexing of multiple data streams while also producing spatially diverse field distributions that can probe targets. Experimental work has demonstrated that reconfiguring combinations of OAM modes can generate composite beam patterns whose reflections encode location-dependent information, enabling simultaneous high-rate communication and target localization in millimeter-wave systems. Studies in radar and antenna systems have examined the use of structured electromagnetic fields, including OAM modes, within joint radar–communication frameworks, highlighting their potential for enhanced parameter estimation and spatial diversity, while also noting that their performance is fundamentally tied to system geometry and shares similarities with conventional multiple-input multiple-output (MIMO) approaches.

== See also ==
- Angular momentum
- Angular momentum of light
- Orbital angular momentum of free electrons
- Circular polarization
- Hypergeometric-Gaussian modes
- Laguerre-Gaussian modes
- Spin angular momentum of light
- Paraxial approximation
- Polarization (waves)
- Siae Microelettronica patent
