= Siae Microelettronica =

Italian company

Siae Microelettronica S.p.A.
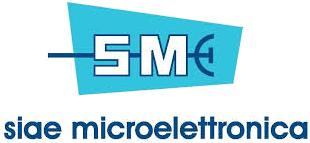
- Type: Private
- Industry: Telecommunications equipment Networking equipment Communications
- Founded: 1952; 74 years ago
- Founder: Edoardo Mascetti
- Headquarters: Cologno Monzese (Milan) Italy
- Area served: Worldwide
- Products: Wireless backhaul and Fronthaul
- Number of employees: +1500 (2016)

Siae Microelettronica is an Italian multinational corporation and a global supplier of telecom network equipment. It provides wireless backhaul and fronthaul products that consist of microwave and millimeter wave radio systems, along with fiber optics transmission systems provided by its subsidiary SM Optics.

The company is headquartered in Milan, Italy, with 26 regional offices around the globe.

== Corporate history ==
=== 1952–1970s: Origins and initial growth ===
Edoardo Mascetti, after graduating in 1949 in Electrical Engineering at the Polytechnic University of Milan and working as electronic designer for Siemens, founded his company and named it SIAE, acronym for Società Italiana Apparecchiature Elettroniche The company manufactured measurement systems such as electro-mechanical testers, analog oscilloscopes, telephone system analyzers and signal generators.

A 431A-model oscilloscope by SIAE was also part of the synthesizer in the Studio di fonologia musicale di Radio Milano (RAI) until its dismissal in 1983 and is currently on permanent display with the original study equipment at the Musical Instrument museum hosted at the Castello Sforzesco, Milan.

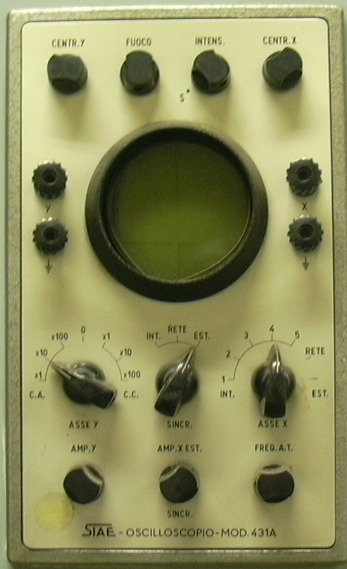
SIAE Oscilloscope 431A (introduced in 1963) used for the synthesizer in the Studio di fonologia musicale di Radio Milano

A few years after founding SIAE, Edoardo Mascetti co-founded in 1958 Microelettronica S.p.A., a company whose business was the design of telecommunication equipment for radio and landline systems and which was initially located in a basement in Milan. In 1963, the two complementary companies were merged into Siae Microelettronica S.p.A. and the headquarters was moved to the nearby town of Cologno Monzese, where a larger area was available to accommodate the new offices and manufacturing plant.

The new company counted less than 50 employees and focused its business on telecommunication systems, which were rising thanks to the capillary diffusion of telephone systems in Italy. Analog multiplexing systems for telephone providers constituted the company's principal product; nonetheless, in 1963, the company began an active collaboration with ENEL, an Italian provider of electric power, in order to create a supervision system for the national distribution network, whose successful outcome later fostered similar activities in northern Europe and specifically in Norway.

By the mid '60s, the company began growing due to its first large-scale commercialized radio transceiver: the 3-channel 3-B3 and later the RT450 (1966), capable of aggregating 48 channels into UHF band. The RT450 equipment was also certified by it:Telettra under the commercial name H450 as a fallback link for its high-capacity solutions. Power-line communication systems were also manufactured by the company in those years along with the first fixed and mobile communication terminals in VHF band (1972) for vehicular communications (predating modern mobile phones) and anti burglar alarm systems.

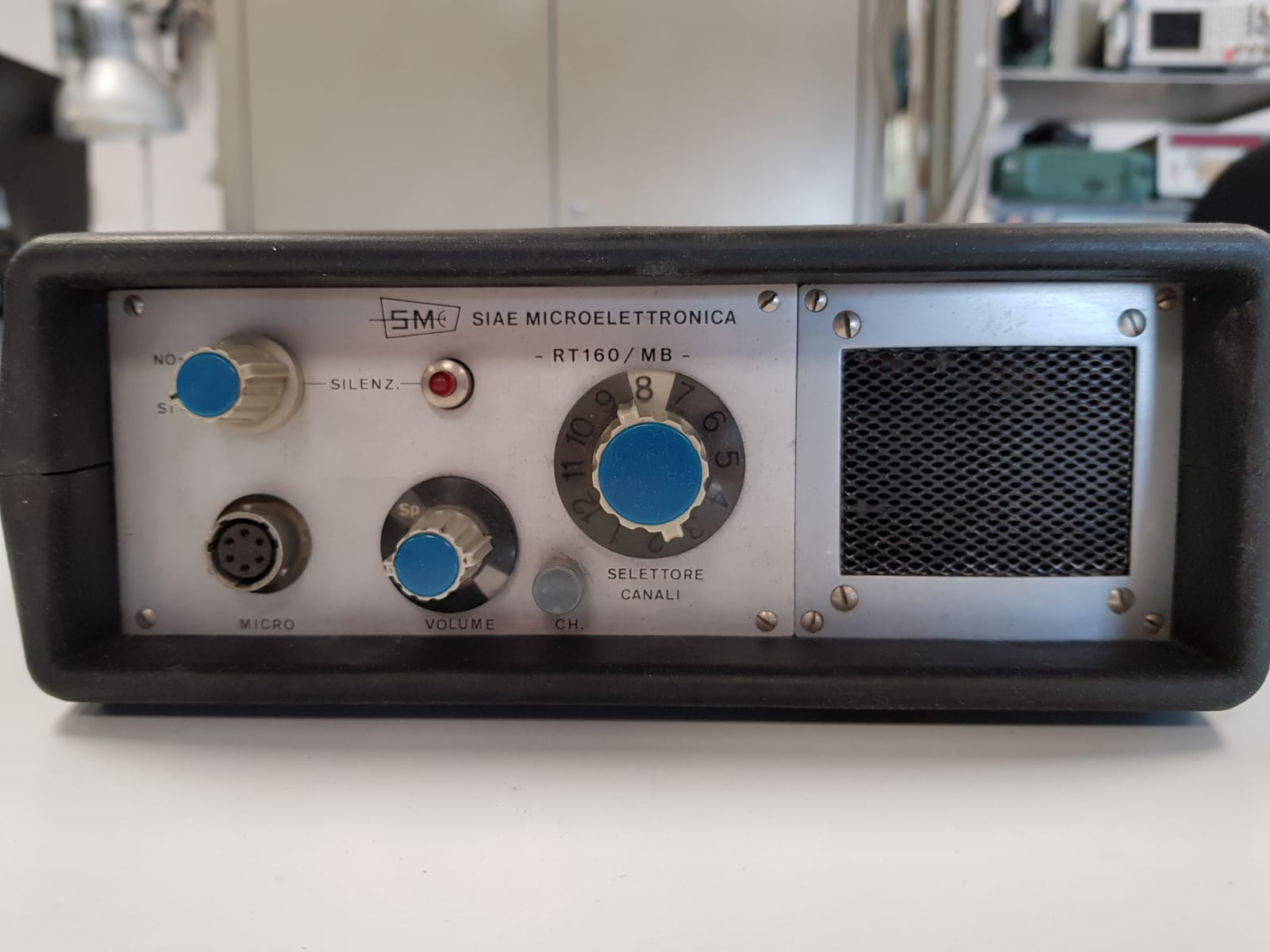
160 MHz vehicular transceiver for ENEL network from the '70s

By 1973, a new internal division was created for the design of television broadcasting equipment (repeaters and transmitters) whose main customer was the national television company RAI. The first television products were based on thermo-ionic tubes though the improvement of solid state technologies soon replaced vacuum tubes. Similar improvements in printed board manufacturing made microstrip circuits a viable solution for increasingly high microwave frequencies and in 1978 the RT12 radio equipment boasted the first direct-conversion 2.3 GHz synthesized modulator and could aggregate 120 telephone channels.

In these years, the company manufactured the historical link to connect the Milan and Rome branches of the Corriere della Sera newspaper.

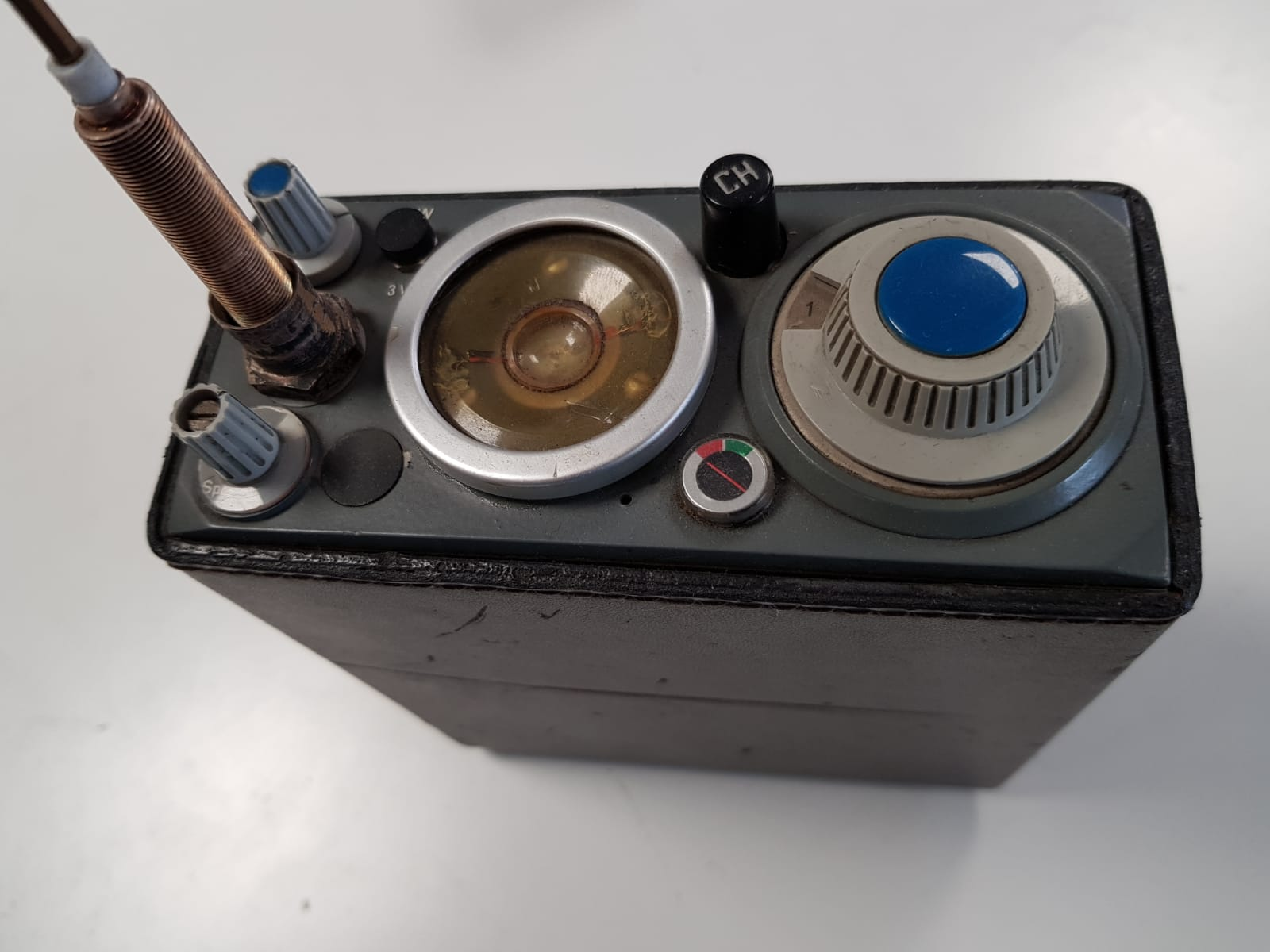
75 MHz vehicular transceiver supplied to the traffic police from the '70s.

The employees were about a hundred though the company still remained a family-run business led by the founder and a tight board of managers through the 1970s. Computer-aided design of electronic circuits was approached and exploited to improve yield and reduce the design time especially for the critical high-frequency sections.

=== 1980s-2000s: Digital and worldwide company ===
The early '80s witnessed two intertwined aspects which boosted the activities: the digital revolution reached commercial radio links and the RT20 thus leveraged 4-QAM modulation in order to provide low-capacity links while the increased globalization opened up international markets and the company business expanded to Norway, Great Britain and gradually to Europe. A quality control system was soon implemented to meet and certify the improved production standards.

In partnership with then it:Telettra, the Company developed the multi channel radio network covering the national extents, named RIAM, for the national electric company, Enel. The radio equipment was governed by a microprocessor, in the wake of the widespread usage of these new components which offered a huge range of new possibilities for coordinating radio components when compared to traditional dedicated circuits.

With the increased demand for traffic, higher frequencies were needed and in the second half of the 80's the company commercialized its 18 GHz radio transceiver with a capacity up to 2 Mbit/s, based on specifications of Enel. A 13 GHz equipment with 4 Mbit/s was instead first provided to the Mercury operator in the UK.

Thin film manufacturing techniques for printed circuit boards were adopted during the 80s by the company for its microwave products beyond 10 GHz with ad-hoc equipment and production lines (yellow room) and soon upgraded to chip-and-wire technologies in white rooms (clean room). Documents show the RT28 transceiver remained in service until 2008 in the Italian Aosta Valley.

In 1986 the Company introduced the "split-mount" configuration, where an indoor unit (IDU) is connected to an outdoor unit ODU. The IDU provides the network interfaces and carries out the baseband tasks while communicating with the ODU, usually by means of an intermediate frequency, which is tasked of radio frequency up/down conversion and is connected to the antenna. The split-mount configuration is still currently in use in several modern radio products and the boost in sales at that time was recognized in the 1988 edition of Major Companies of Europe.

In the early '90s the diffusion of data services and SDH required higher capacities to be transported and in 1992 the Company provided its HS13 SDH equipment to the SIP telephone company (later become Telecom Italia) entering thus the market of high-capacity microwave radio links and introducing enhanced techniques to counteract non-idealities in the communication channel and the transceiver hardware.

Simultaneously, subsidiaries were opened in Latin America and the Far East. To meet international standards for control and supervision of the increasingly complex networks of radio links, the Company developed its own Network management system providing a unified interface for all its products. One of the first versions of monitoring software was still in use as of 2012 for a it:TETRA network.

In the meantime, the production of television transmitters and repeaters was halted in order to focus the activities towards the core business of backhauling radio links. The increased volume of chip and wire components fostered the introduction of improved Cleanrooms, upgraded to the 10 000 class. The Company further evolved internally to expand its business and offer the services surrounding the mere provision of hardware, such as network planning, assistance, installation and contributed to the activities of international standardization bodies.

In the late 90s the Company commercialized a family of products whose design was dedicated to the booming market of GSM cellular mobile communications. In 1999, the offer was expanded to support high-capacity SDH traffic and a number of multiplexing equipment was developed as well to address the increased complexity and demanded flexibility of network configurations and interfaces.

=== Present day ===
The twenty-first century was inaugurated by the first direct collaboration and commercial relationships with China which in 2014 lead to a dedicated subsidiary, Siae Telecommunications Shenzhen Limited. The first European subsidiary opened in 2002 in Paris while the first non-European branch initiated activities in 2006 in Bangkok. The production and assembly processes began transitioning from manual to automatic SMT placement equipment in the early 2000s to cope with a volume of 15'000 radios/year while the yearly sales in 2002 increased by 25.8%.

In partnership with Cisco, the Company developed algorithms and dedicated implementations for adaptive bandwidth and adaptive modulation schemes, which allow to react to impaired communication conditions (such as rain) gracefully reducing the link throughput instead of temporarily suspending the communication (out of service). Such solutions, extensively relied upon for network planning, are currently standard in most modern point-to-point radio links for backhauling.

In the wake of the global migration from circuit switching towards IP packet networks, the Company developed Full IP equipment in split-mount and full-outdoor versions and also dual native radios, supporting both TDM and Ethernet modes, whose popularity positively affected the company's sales volume. To meet the ever-increasing demand for higher throughput without need for additional bandwidth, which is licensed at a price in most dedicated bands, frequency reuse dominated subsequent industrial developments and the adoption of dual-polarization techniques was commercially proposed in 2007, when the company and Vodafone (Omnitel by that time) presented the paper "2xSTM1 frequency reuse system with XPIC" at the European Conference on Fixed Wireless Network Technologies 2007 in Paris.

Thanks to Full IP and XPIC equipment sales, the yearly production of radios hit 70'000 in 2011 while the sales income topped 180 million Euro and by the end of 2012 the number of people employed by the company exceeded 1000 over the 25 world branches, about 700 of which located in the Cologno Monzese headquarters.

The juridical literature reports of a litigation initiated in 2006 by NEC Corporation against SIAE MICROELETTRONICA over alleged infringement of several former patents in the courts of Milan and Munich. The case was closed in 2010 with a bilateral agreement to withdraw all infringement, nullity and opposition actions pending worldwide.

Although not directly involved in antenna manufacturing, the Company and Polytechnic University of Milan patented in 2011 a dielectric antenna for mm-wave communications based on a novel design aimed at reducing the overall size, whose application targeted small form factor radio equipment. The visual impact of transceivers began in those years to earn importance for the deployment of urban links, where the existing environment should be affected as little as possible by access stations and backhauling transceivers with their antennas.

In 2013, the company entered the millimeter-wave market with its full-outdoor transceivers in E-Band. In 2014, the product portfolio included also V band radios for small cell backhaul and NLOS solutions for urban communications which may benefit from exploiting reflections on buildings in order to increase coverage. A new network monitoring software was also released in 2014 to offer enhanced features to network operators for managing and evaluating aggregated performances, which are gaining more and more relevance as key figures in the assessment of traffic bottlenecks and overall behavior of a complex network.

In 2014, the labs for the management system for terrestrial networks and two families of equipment for fiber optic telecommunications—OMSN (Optical Multi-Service Node) and TSS (Transport Service Switch)—were transferred from Alcatel Lucent (now Nokia) to a new dedicated company, SM Optics, a subsidiary of Siae Microelettronica.

From 2014 to 2016, through its entirely owned company "Twist-off" in Padua (Italy), Siae Microelettronica was active in researching applications of Orbital Angular Momentum of light (OAM) communications applied to long-distance links. Field tests of the principals were also published and filed under an industrial patent based on the twisted parabola. As a means to increase capacity and frequency reuse orbital angular momentum multiplexing was also compared to traditional MIMO spatial multiplexing techniques in terms of antenna size/spacing/occupation and achievable performance, which resulted in a critical assessment showing that both have equal performances. Near field properties of OAM beams at microwaves have also been investigated resulting in valid theoretical and practical demonstrations to lay the ground for short-range secure communications with application to contactless payments and transactions, filed under a dedicated patent.

The company continues its long standing cooperation strategy with research institutions and in 2015 it joined the Laurea Magistrale Plus program, promoted by University of Pavia for Master's degree achieved with an extended and close participation in existing companies' activities.

In 2016, the company presented, at the Mobile World Congress, Layer-3 VPN services over microwave radio links using SM-OS, based on Software-defined networking (SDN).

In 2016, an internal team of researchers coauthored the "Receiver", "Modem" and "Antenna" chapters in a comprehensive book describing electronic design of transceiver frontends for backhauling.

In 2017, the Company became a technological partner of Vodafone for the 5G project. The Company enabled the interconnection of 5G Base Stations through 10 Gbit/s microwave radio links ALFOplus80HDX in the Metropolitan area of Milan. Italian Ministry of Economic Development evaluated Vodafone's 5G experimental project with the highest rating."

Since 2018, Siae Microelettronica is institutional partner of the Politecnico di Milano Foundation, as expression of its tight relationship with the university community and the increasingly strategic cooperation between technological companies and academic researchers.

In 2023, SIAE MICROELETTRONICA enabled by IPCEI for innovative microelectronics and communication technologies "Made in Europe"

On February 5th, 2024, the Italian Patent and Trademark Office officially notified the inclusion of SIAE MICROELETTRONICA in its register as a Historic Brand of National Interest.
