= PKS 1144−379 =

Quasar in the constellation Centaurus

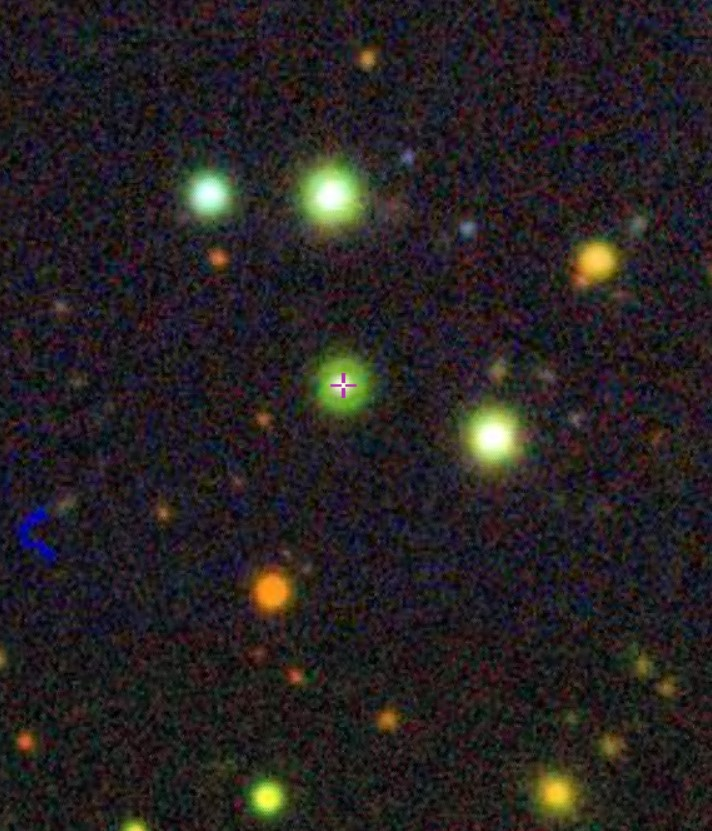
- PKS 1144−379 seen by DESI Legacy Surveys

Observation data (J2000.0 epoch)
- Constellation: Centaurus
- Right ascension: 11^{h} 47^{m} 01.37^{s}
- Declination: −38° 12′ 11.02″
- Redshift: 1.049000
- Heliocentric radial velocity: 314,482 km/s
- Distance: 7.709 Gly (light travel time distance)
- Apparent magnitude (V): 16.2

Characteristics
- Type: Opt. var; FSRQ, BL Lac
- Notable features: Quasar with high variability

Other designations
- WMAP 169, PGC 2826879, IRAS F11445−3755, NVSS J114701−381211, RFC J1147−3812, IRCF J114701.3−381211, MRC 1144−379, PG 1144−379, SUMSS J114701−381210

PKS 1144−379 also known as PKS B1144−379, is a quasar located in the constellation of Centaurus. At the redshift of 1.048, the object is located nearly 8 billion light-years from Earth.

== Characteristics ==
PKS 1144−379 is classified as a flat-spectrum radio quasar (FSRQ), brighter than S_{4.8 GHz}=65 mJy. It has an active galactic nucleus with high optical polarization. As monitored at 13 cm and 6 cm by researchers over three years, which they found it as a star-like object, PKS 1144−379 has been identified as BL lac object of M_{v} ≈16.2, due to its variability in optical, infrared, and radio wavelengths. Such BL Lac objects like PKS 1144−379 are rare active galactic nuclei class, characterized by all frequencies, and absence of emission lines.

PKS 1144−379 is also radio variable as observed in the Parkes 2700 MHz survey by researchers working at Parkes Observatory. The quasar is dominated by its bright compact radio core, but according to maps that is made with a high dynamic range, it shows an extended structure. PKS 1144−379 also has a luminosity above both FR I/FR II limit ~ 10^{32} erg s^{−1} Hz^{−1} at 5 GHz and such also classified as a blazar, a type of active galaxy that is producing radiation, observed at wavelengths from radio to gamma rays.

== Observation of PKS 1144−379 ==
PKS 1144−379 is known to be variable for its long and short-term flux density variability at centimeter wavelengths. Some of the first observations of PKS 1144−379 showed variability at frequencies of 5 GHz. The flux density is shown to increase from 0.9 Jy to 1.6 Jy between December 1970 and February, 1971. In September of the same year, it had increased again to 2.22 Jy. Between May and August 1994, the flux density of PKS 1144−379 at 4.8GHz dropped by 17%, and subsequently 9% at 8.6 GHz.

In June 1996, PKS 1144−379 underwent optical variation again. Over the next 2.5 days, the survey data shows the quasar had a 33% change at 4.8 GHz. Subsequent data showed more variations in PKS 1144−379 with maximum of 8.6 GHz with over three hours of irregular change of 20%. This is strongly correlated with 10% change at 4.8 GHz. From the results studying the variability behavior of PKS 1144−379, researchers found the optical variation is 1.92 mag. This is smaller than those, ~ 3.5 mag in its infrared region.

Using the Ceduna 30-m radio telescope at a frequency of 6.7 GHz and very long baseline interferometry (VLBI) data at 8.6 GHz at the University of Tasmania in Australia, researchers investigated the evolution of PKS 1144−379. They found the variability time-scales associated with two flares detected in PKS 1144−379 between November 2005 and August 2008 were found to derive from long-term variations in total flux density as monitored by Ceduna between 2003 and 2011. Moreover, a kinematic study of the parsec-scale jet of PKS 1144−379 was also performed through VLBI data obtained between 1997 and 2018, which they observe quasi-periodic flarings of ~3-4 yr. Over the 20-yr interval, they found the average jet position angle was ~150°. The core component of PKS 1144−379 is found to be compacted, which its angular size varied between the ranges of 5.65-15.90 Чas estimating to be 0.05-0.13 pc.

Researchers assumed the variations observed in PKS 1144−379, are due to scintillation. The variations are 6.2 trillion K at 4.9 GHz with approximately 10% of total flux density found in the scintillating component. Given the results, PKS 1144−379 has a high modulation index in the range of 5–18% combined with the 1.2 day characteristic timescale (corresponding to a peak-to-peak period of 7.7 days), making it the most extreme bright scintillators identified in history. According to observations by Fermi, PKS 1144−379 has a column dissipation radius of 64.5 × 10^{15} cm (430) R_{S} with an accretion disc luminosity of 10^{45} erg s^{−1} 3 × (0.04) L_{Edd}. The jet power as the form of radiation for the quasar has a log probability of 44.92 log P_{r} with Poynting flux of 44.49 log P_{B} while the bulk motion of electrons and protons is found to be 44.34 log P_{e} and 46.41 log P_{p}. From the results, PKS 1144−379 has an estimated black hole mass of 10^{8}–10^{9} M_{⊙,} whom researchers noted.
