= Hertel & Reuss =

Former manufacturer of optical instruments

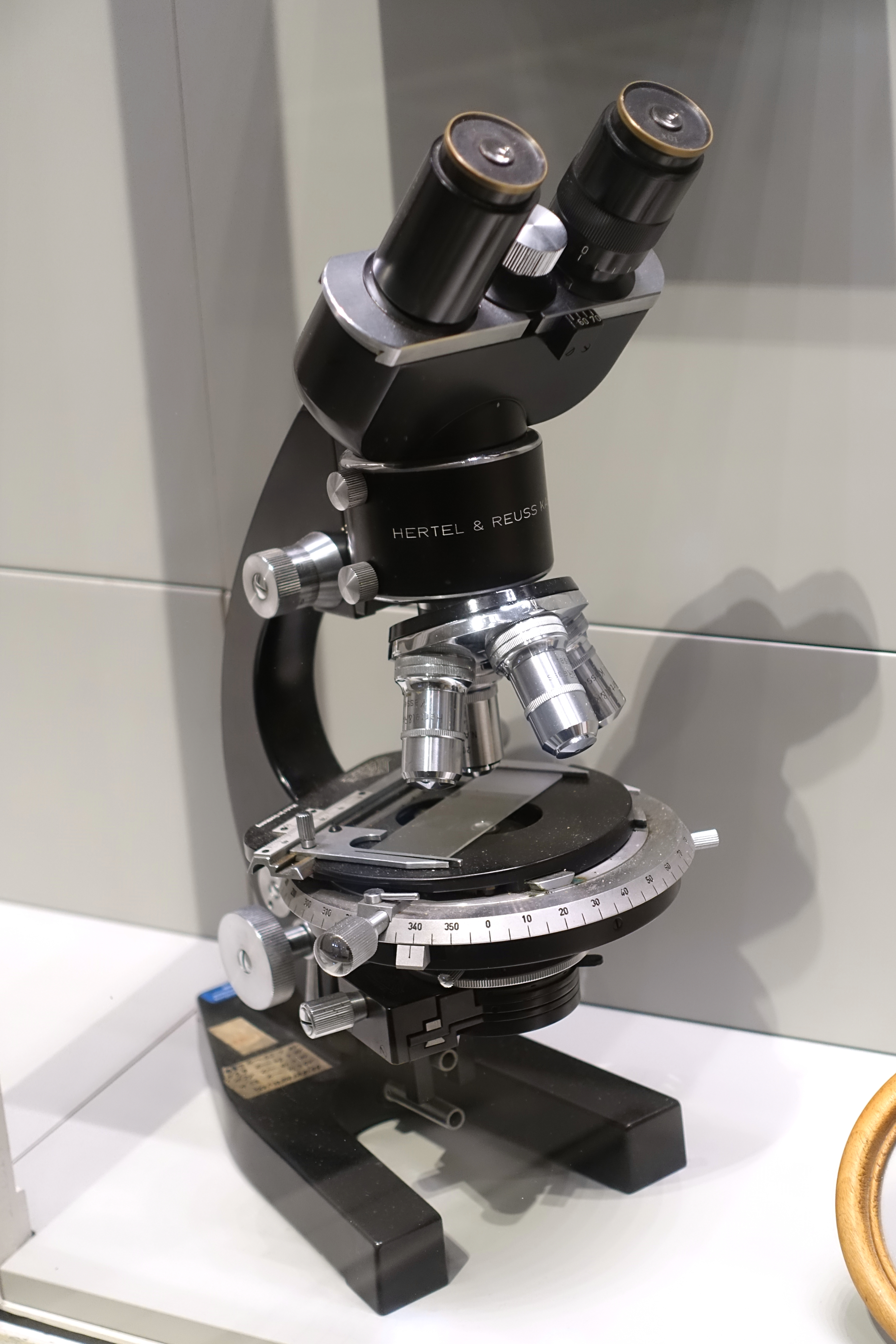
Hertel & Reuss microscope

Hertel & Reuss was a manufacturer of optical instruments based in Kassel, Germany, which emerged around 1995 following the bankruptcy of its predecessor company (founded in 1927 by Otto Hertel and Eduard Reuss.) The owners of Hertel & Reuss KG were Herr Eduard Reuss and his two sons Herr Gerhard Reuss and Herr Helmut Reuss. It had around 400 employees in the 1970s and exported worldwide. Main products consisted of high-quality binoculars, telescopes and as well as microscopes for educational purposes. The company existed until 1995.
