= Optical instrument =

Scientific instrument using light waves for image viewing

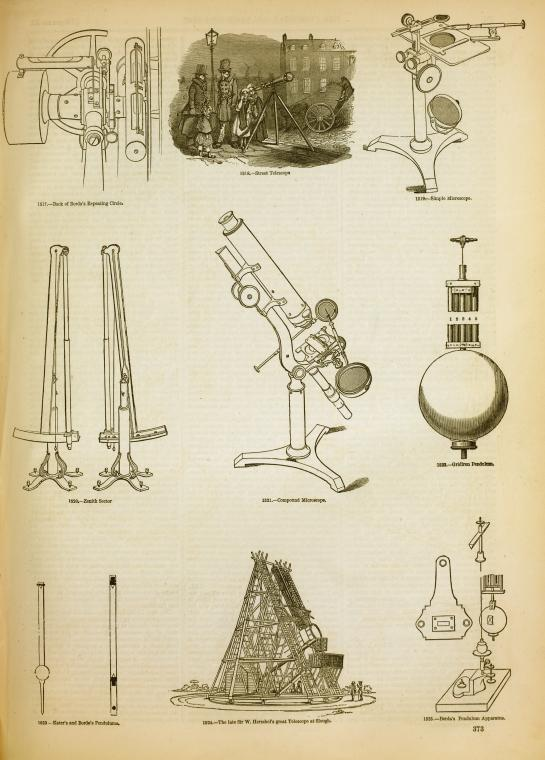
An illustration of some of the optical devices available for laboratory work in England in 1858.

An optical instrument is a device that processes light waves (or photons), either to enhance an image for viewing or to analyze and determine their characteristic properties. Common examples include periscopes, microscopes, telescopes, and cameras.

== Image enhancement ==
The first optical instruments were telescopes used for magnification of distant images, and microscopes used for magnifying very tiny images. Since the days of Galileo and Van Leeuwenhoek, these instruments have been greatly improved and extended into other portions of the electromagnetic spectrum. The binocular device is a generally compact instrument for both eyes designed for mobile use. A camera could be considered a type of optical instrument, with the pinhole camera and camera obscura being very simple examples of such devices.

== Analysis ==
Another class of optical instrument is used to analyze the properties of light or optical materials. They include:

- Interferometer for measuring the interference properties of light waves
- Photometer for measuring light intensity
- Polarimeter for measuring dispersion or rotation of polarized light
- Reflectometer for measuring the reflectivity of a surface or object
- Refractometer for measuring refractive index of various materials
- Spectrometer or monochromator for generating or measuring a portion of the optical spectrum, for the purpose of chemical or material analysis
- Autocollimator which is used to measure angular deflections
- Vertometer which is used to determine refractive power of lenses such as glasses, contact lenses and magnifier lens

DNA sequencers can be considered optical instruments, as they analyse the color and intensity of the light emitted by a fluorochrome attached to a specific nucleotide of a DNA strand.

Surface plasmon resonance-based instruments use refractometry to measure and analyze biomolecular interactions.

== Other types ==
- Magic lantern
- Polarization controller

== See also ==
- Scientific instruments
