= Vector radiative transfer =

In spectroscopy and radiometry, vector radiative transfer (VRT) is a method of modelling the propagation of polarized electromagnetic radiation in low density media. In contrast to scalar radiative transfer (RT), which models only the first Stokes component, the intensity, VRT models all four components through vector methods.

For a single frequency, $\nu$, the VRT equation for a scattering media can be written as follows:

$$\frac{d}{ds} \vec I(\hat n, \nu) = - \mathbf K \vec I + \vec a B(\nu, T)
+ \int_{4\pi} \mathbf Z(\hat n, \hat n', \nu) \, \vec I \, d\hat{n}'$$

where s is the path, $\hat n$ is the propagation vector, K is the extinction matrix, $\vec a$ is the absorption vector, B is the Planck function and Z is the scattering phase matrix.

All the coefficient matrices, K, $\vec a$ and Z, will vary depending on the density of absorbers/scatterers present and must be calculated from their density-independent quantities, that is the attenuation coefficient vector, $\vec a$, is calculated from the mass absorption coefficient vector times the density of the absorber. Moreover, it is typical for media to have multiple species causing extinction, absorption and scattering, thus these coefficient matrices must be summed up over all the different species.

Extinction is caused both by simple absorption as well as from scattering out of the line-of-sight, $\hat n$, therefore we calculate the extinction matrix from the combination of the absorption vector and the scattering phase matrix:

$$\mathbf K(\hat n, \nu) = \vec a(\nu)\mathbf I + \int_{4\pi} \mathbf Z(\hat n^\prime, \hat n, \nu) \, d \hat{n}'$$

where I is the identity matrix.

The four-component radiation vector, $\vec I = (I, Q, U, V)$ where I, Q, U, and V are the first through fourth elements of the Stokes parameters, respectively, fully describes the polarization state of the electromagnetic radiation. It is this vector-nature that considerably complicates the equation. Absorption will be different for each of the four components, moreover, whenever the radiation is scattered, there can be a complex transfer between the different Stokes components—see polarization mixing—thus the scattering phase function has 4×4=16 components. It is, in fact, a rank-two tensor.
