= Polarization scrambling =

Polarization scrambling is the process of rapidly varying the polarization of light within a system using a polarization controller so that the average polarization over time is effectively randomized. Polarization scrambling can be used in scientific experiments to cancel out errors caused by polarization effects. Polarization scrambling is also used on long-distance fibre optic transmission systems with optical amplifiers, in order to avoid polarization hole-burning. Polarization scrambling, also for the variation of polarization mode dispersion, is a mandatory test procedure for fiber optic data transmission systems based on polarization-division multiplexing.

Polarization scramblers usually vary the normalized Stokes vector of the polarization state over the entire Poincaré sphere. They are commercially available with speeds of 20 Mrad/s on the Poincaré sphere (see external link). Various speed distributions such as peaked and quasi-Rayleigh can be generated.

Some experiments have implemented ultrafast polarization scrambling on a polaritonic platform with speeds in the order of the Trad/s on the Poincaré sphere.

== See also ==
- Depolarizer (optics)
- Polarization-division multiplexing
- Polarization controller
- Polarization mixing
