= Resonant-cavity-enhanced photo detector =

Resonant-cavity-enhanced photodetectors, also known as RCE photodetectors, are sensors designed to detect light or other forms of electromagnetic radiation. They achieve this by utilizing an optical cavity—a configuration of mirrors or other optical elements that forms a cavity resonator for light waves, allowing for more efficient targeting of specific wavelengths.

In RCE photodetectors, the active device structure of a photodetector is placed inside a Fabry–Pérot interferometer. This interferometer has two parallel surfaces between which a selected wavelength of light can resonate, amplifying the optical field. While the active device structure of RCE detectors is similar to that of conventional photodetectors, the amplification effect of the optical cavity allows RCE photodetectors to be made thinner and therefore faster, while simultaneously increasing the quantum efficiency at the resonant wavelengths.

== Advantages ==
The quantum efficiency of conventional detectors is dominated by the optical absorption (electromagnetic radiation) of the semiconductor material. For semiconductors with low absorption coefficients, a thicker absorption region is required to achieve adequate quantum efficiency, but at the cost of the signal-processing bandwidth of the photodetector.

An RCE detector can have significantly higher bandwidth than a conventional detector. The constructive interference of a Fabry–Pérot cavity enhances the optical field inside the photodetector at the resonance wavelengths to achieve a quantum efficiency of close to unity. Moreover, the optical cavity makes the RCE detectors wavelength selective, making RCE photodetectors a viable option for low crosstalk wavelength demultiplexing. Improved quantum efficiency reduces power consumption, while higher bandwidth translates to faster operation.

The RCE photodetectors have both wavelength selectivity and high-speed response making them ideal for wavelength division multiplexing applications. Optical modulators situated in an optical cavity require fewer quantum wells to absorb the same fraction of the incident light and can therefore operate at lower voltages. In the case of emitters, the cavity modifies the spontaneous emission of light-emitting diodes (LED) improving their spectral purity and directivity.

Optical communication systems can perform much faster, with more bandwidth and can become more reliable. Camera sensors could give more resolutions, better contrast ratios and less distortion. For these reasons, RCE devices can be expected to play a growing role in optical electronics over the coming years.

== Theory of RCE photo detectors ==
Compared to a conventional photodiode, RCE photo detectors can provide higher quantum efficiency, a higher detection speed and can also provide wavelength selective detection.

=== Quantum efficiency of RCE photo detectors ===
The RCE photodetectors are expected to have higher quantum efficiency η than compared to conventional photodiodes. The formulation of η for RCE devices gives insight to the design criteria.

A generalized RCE photodetector can give the required theoretical model of photodetection. A thin absorption region of thickness d is sandwiched between two relatively less absorbing regions, substrate, of thickness L_{1} and L_{2}. The optical cavity is formed by a period of λ/4 distributed Bragg reflector (DBR), made of non-absorbing larger bandgap materials, at the end of the substrate. The front mirror has a transmittance of t_{1} and generally has lower reflectivity than compared to the mirror at back (R_{1} < R_{2} ). Transmittance t_{1} allows light to enter into the cavity, and reflectivity R_{1} (=r_{1}^{2}) and R_{2} (=r_{2}^{2}) provides the optical confinement in the cavity.

The active region and the substrate region have absorption coefficient α and α_{ex} respectively. The field reflection coefficients of the front and the back mirrors are $r_1 e^{-j\phi_1}$ and $r_2e^{-j\phi_2}$ respectively, where ф_{1} and ф_{2} are the phase shifts due to the light penetration (see Penetration Depth) into the mirrors.

The optical microcavity allows building up an optical field inside the optical cavity. In compared to conventional detector, where light is absorbed in a single pass through the absorption region, for RCE detectors trapped light is absorbed each time it traverses through the absorption region.

The Quantum efficiency $\eta$ for a RCE detector is given by:

$$\eta=(1-R_1)(1-e^{-\alpha d} ) \left[ \frac {( e^{-\alpha_{ex} L_1} +r_2^2 e^{-\alpha_{ex} L_2 - \alpha_c L} )}{1 - 2 r_1 r_2 e^{- \alpha_c L}\cos(2\beta L+ \phi_1 + \phi_2) + (r_1r_2)^2 e^{- \alpha_c L}} \right]$$

Here $\alpha_c=\frac{\alpha_{\text{ex}}L_1+\alpha_{\text{ex}}L_2+\alpha d}{L}$. In practical detector design α_{ex} << α, so α_{ex} can be neglected and $\eta$ can be given as:

$$\eta=(1-R_1)(1-e^{-\alpha d} ) \left[ \frac {( 1 +R_2 e^{-\alpha d} )}{1 - 2 \sqrt{R_1 R_2} e^{- \alpha_c d}\cos(2\beta L+ \phi_1 + \phi_2) + (R_1 R_2) e^{- \alpha_c d}} \right]$$

The term inside the brackets represents the cavity enhancement effect. This is a periodic function of $2\beta L+\phi_1+\phi_2$, which has minima at $2\beta L+\phi_1+\phi_2=2m\pi$. And η enhanced periodically at resonance wavelength that meets this condition. The spacing of the resonant wavelength is given by the Free Spectral Range of the cavity.

The peak value of η at resonant wavelength is given as:

$$\eta=(1-R_1)(1-e^{-\alpha d} ) \left[ \frac {( 1 +R_2 e^{-\alpha d} )}{(1 -  \sqrt{R_1 R_2} e^{- \alpha_c d})^2} \right]$$

for a thin active layer as αd<<1, η becomes:

$$\eta=(1-R_1)\alpha d \left[ \frac {( 1 +R_2 e^{-\alpha d} )}{(1 -  \sqrt{R_1 R_2} e^{- \alpha_c d})^2} \right]$$

This is a significant improvement from the quantum efficiency of a conventional photodetector which is given by:

$$\eta=(1-R) \alpha L$$.

This shows that higher quantum efficiency can be achieved for smaller absorption regions.

The critical design requirements are a very high back mirror reflectivity and a moderate absorption layer thickness. At optical frequencies, metal mirrors have low reflectivity (94%) when used on materials like GaAs. This makes metal mirrors inefficient for RCE detection. Whereas distributed Bragg reflector (DBR) can provide reflectivity near unity and are ideal choice for RCE structures.

For an R_{1}=0.2, R_{2}=0.99, and α=10^{4} cm^{−1}, an η of 0.99 or more can be achievable for d=0.7–0.95 μm. Similarly, for different values of R_{1,} very high η is possible to achieve. However, R_{1}=0 limits the length of the thickness region. d>5 μm can achieve 0.99 η, but at the cost of bandwidth.

=== Detection speed of RCE photodiodes ===
The detection speed depends upon the drift velocities of the electrons and holes. And between these two holes have slower drift velocity than the electrons. The transit time limited bandwidth of conventional p-i-n photodiode is given by:

$$f_{\text{transit}} =0.45\frac{v_h}{L}$$

However, the quantum efficiency is a function of L as:

$$\eta=(1-R) \alpha L$$.

For a high-speed detector for a small value of L, as α is very small, η becomes very small (η<<1). This shows for an optimum value of quantum efficiency the bandwidth has to sacrifice.

A p-i-n RCE photodetector can reduce the absorption region to a much smaller scale. In this case the carriers need to traverse a smaller distance as well, L_{1} (< L) and L_{2} (< L) for electrons and holes respectively.

The length of L1 and L2 can also be optimized to match the delay between the hole and electron drift. Afterwards, the transition bandwidth is given by:

$$f_{\text{transit}} =0.45\frac{v_h + v_e}{L+d}$$

As in most of semiconductors $v_e$ is more than $v_h$ the bandwidth increases drastically.

It has been reported that for a large device of L=0.5 μm 64 GHz of bandwidth can be achieved and a small device of L=0.25 μm can give 120 GHz bandwidth, whereas conventional photodetectors have a bandwidth of 10–30 GHz.

=== Wavelength selectivity of RCE photo detectors ===
An RCE structure can make the detector wavelength selective to an extent due to the resonance properties of the cavity. The resonance condition of the cavity is given as $2\beta L+\phi_1+\phi_2=2m\pi$. For any other value the efficiency η reduces from its maximum value, and vanishes when $2\beta L+\phi_1+\phi_2=(2m+1)\pi$. The wavelength spacing of the maxima of η is separated by the free spectral range of the cavity, given as:

$$FSR=\frac {\lambda^2}  {2 n_{\text{eff}} (L + L_{\text{eff},1} + L_{\text{eff},2})}$$

Where n_{eff} is the effective refractive index and L_{eff,i} are the effective optical path lengths of the mirrors.

Finesse, the ratio of the FSR to the FWHM at the resonant wavelength, gives the wavelength selectivity of the cavity.

$$\text{Finesse} = \frac{\pi(R_1R_2)^{1/4} e^{-\frac{\alpha d}{2}}} {(1 -  \sqrt{R_1 R_2} e^{- \alpha_c d})^2}$$

This shows that the wavelength selectivity increases with higher reflectivity and smaller values of L.

== Material requirements for RCE devices ==
The estimated superior performance of the RCE devices critically depends on the realization of a very low loss active region. This enforces the conditions that: the mirror and the cavity materials must be non-absorbing at the detection wavelength, and the mirror should have very high reflectivity so that it gives the highest optical confinement inside the cavity.

The absorption in the cavity can be limited by making the bandgap of the active region smaller than the cavity and the mirror. But a large difference in the bandgap would be a blockage in the extraction of photo-generated carriers from a heterojunction. Usually, a moderate offset is kept within the absorption spectrum.

Different material combinations satisfy all of the above criteria and are therefore used in the RCE scheme. Some material combinations used for RCE detection are:

1.GaAs(M,C) / AlGaAs(M) / InGaAs(A) near 830-920nm.
2.InP(C) / In_{0.53}Ga_{0.47}As(M) / In_{0.52}Al_{0.48}As(M) / In_{0.53–0.7}GaAs(A) near 1550nm.
3.GaAs(M,C) / AlAs(M) / Ge(A) near 830-920nm.
4.Si(M,C) / SiGe(M) / Ge(A) near 1550nm.
5.GaP(M) / AlP(M) / Si(A,S) near visible region.

== Future of RCE photodiodes ==
There are many examples of RCE devices such as the p-i-n photodiode, Avalanche photodiode and Schottky diode that verifies the theory successfully. Some of them are already in use today, while there are future use cases such as modulators, and optical logics in wavelength division multiplexing (WDM) systems which could enhance the quantum efficiency, operating bandwidth, and wavelength selectivity.

RCE detectors are preferable in potential price and performance in commercial WDM systems. RCE detectors have potential for implementation in WDM systems and improve performance significantly. There are various implementations of RCE modulators are made and room for further improvement in the performance of those. Other than the photodetectors the RCE structures have many other implementations and a very high potential for improved performance. A Light Emitting Diode (LED) can be made to have narrower spectrum and higher directivity to allow more coupling to optical fibre and better utilization of the Fiber bandwidth. Optical amplifiers can be made to have a more compact, thus lower power required to pump and also at a lower cost. Photonic logics will also work more efficiently than they do. There will be much less crosstalk and more speed, with simple design.

== See also ==
- PIN diode
- Schottky diode
- Avalanche photodiode
- Wavelength selective switching
- Photonic integrated circuit
- Semiconductor material
- Fabry–Pérot interferometer
- Fresnel equations
- Resonance
- Optical cavity
- Photoelectric effect
