= Sensitivity (electronics) =

Minimum magnitude of input signal to produce a specified output by an electronic device

The sensitivity of an electronic device, such as a communications system receiver, or detection device, such as a PIN diode, is the minimum magnitude of input signal required to produce a specified output signal having a specified signal-to-noise ratio, or other specified criteria. In general, it is the signal level required for a particular quality of received information.

In signal processing, sensitivity also relates to bandwidth and noise floor as is explained in more detail below.

In the field of electronics different definitions are used for sensitivity. The IEEE dictionary states: "Definitions of sensitivity fall into two contrasting categories." It also provides multiple definitions relevant to sensors among which 1: "(measuring devices) The ratio of the magnitude of its response to the magnitude of the quantity measured.” and 2: "(radio receiver or similar device) Taken as the minimum input signal required to produce a specified output signal having a specified signal-to-noise ratio.”. The first of these definitions is similar to the definition of responsivity and as a consequence sensitivity is sometimes considered to be improperly used as a synonym for responsivity, and it is argued that the second definition, which is closely related to the detection limit, is a better indicator of the performance of a measuring system.

To summarize, two contrasting definitions of sensitivity are used in the field of electronics

- Sensitivity first definition: the ratio between output and input signal, or the slope of the output versus input response curve of a transducer, microphone or sensor. An example is given in the section below on electroacoustics.
- Sensitivity second definition: the minimum magnitude of input signal required to produce an output signal with a specified signal-to-noise ratio of an instrument or sensor. Examples of the use of this definition are given in the sections below on receivers and electronic sensors.

== Electroacoustics ==
The sensitivity of a microphone is usually expressed as the sound field strength in decibels (dB) relative to 1 V/Pa (Pa = N/m^{2}) or as the transfer factor in millivolts per pascal (mV/Pa) into an open circuit or into a 1 kiloohm load. The sensitivity of a hydrophone is usually expressed as dB relative to 1 V/μPa.

The sensitivity of a loudspeaker is usually expressed as dB / 2.83 V_{RMS} at 1 metre. This is not the same as the electrical efficiency; see Efficiency vs sensitivity. This is an example where sensitivity is defined as the ratio of the sensor's response to the quantity measured. One should realize that when using this definition to compare sensors, the sensitivity of the sensor might depend on components like output voltage amplifiers, that can increase the sensor response such that the sensitivity is not a pure figure of merit of the sensor alone, but of the combination of all components in the signal path from input to response.

The sensitivity of a powered loudspeaker is defined as the signal level that, when applied to the input, produces maximum output. If the amplifier has variable gain, the gain setting must be specified to make the measurement meaningful.

== Receivers ==
Sensitivity in a receiver, such a radio receiver, indicates its capability to extract information from a weak signal, quantified as the lowest signal level that can be useful. It is mathematically defined as the minimum input signal $S_i$ required to produce a specified signal-to-noise S/N ratio at the output port of the receiver and is defined as the mean noise power at the input port of the receiver times the minimum required signal-to-noise ratio at the output of the receiver:

$$S_i = k(T_a+T_{rx})B \; \cdot \; \frac{S_o}{N_o}$$

where

$S_i$ = sensitivity [W]
$k$ = Boltzmann constant
$T_a$ = equivalent noise temperature in [K] of the source (e.g. antenna) at the input of the receiver
$T_{rx}$ = equivalent noise temperature in [K] of the receiver referred to the input of the receiver
$B$ = bandwidth [Hz]
$\frac{S_o}{N_o}$ = Required SNR at output [-]

The same formula can also be expressed in terms of noise factor of the receiver as

$$S_i = N_i \;\cdot\; F \;\cdot\; SNR_o = k T_a B \;\cdot\; F \;\cdot\; SNR_o$$

where

$F$ = noise factor
$N_i$ = input noise power
$SNR_o$ = required SNR at output.

Because receiver sensitivity indicates how faint an input signal can be to be successfully received by the receiver, the lower power level, the better. Lower input signal power for a given S/N ratio means better sensitivity since the receiver's contribution to the noise is smaller. When the power is expressed in dBm the larger the absolute value of the negative number, the better the receive sensitivity. For example, a receiver sensitivity of −98 dBm is better than a receive sensitivity of −95 dBm by 3 dB, or a factor of two. In other words, at a specified data rate, a receiver with a −98 dBm sensitivity can hear (or extract useable audio, video or data from) signals that are half the power of those heard by a receiver with a −95 dBm receiver sensitivity..

== Electronic sensors ==
For electronic sensors the input signal $S_i$ can be of many types, like position, force, acceleration, pressure, or magnetic field. The output signal for an electronic analog sensor is usually a voltage or a current signal $S_o$. The responsivity of an ideal linear sensor in the absence of noise is defined as $R=S_o/S_i$, whereas for nonlinear sensors it is defined as the local slope $\mathrm{d} S_o/\mathrm{d} S_i$. In the absence of noise and signals at the input, the sensor is assumed to generate a constant intrinsic output noise $N_{oi}$. To reach a specified signal to noise ratio at the output $SNR_o=S_o/N_{oi}$, one combines these equations and obtains the following idealized equation for its sensitivity $S$, which is equal to the value of the input signal $S_{i,SNR_o}$ that results in the specified signal-to-noise ratio $SNR_o$ at the output:

$S= S_{i,SNR_o} = \frac{N_{oi}}{R} SNR_o$

This equation shows that sensor sensitivity can be decreased (=improved) by either reducing the intrinsic noise of the sensor $N_{oi}$ or by increasing its responsivity $R$. This is an example of a case where sensivity is defined as the minimum input signal required to produce a specified output signal having a specified signal-to-noise ratio. This definition has the advantage that the sensitivity is closely related to the detection limit of a sensor if the minimum detectable SNR_{o} is specified (SNR). The choice for the SNR_{o} used in the definition of sensitivity depends on the required confidence level for a signal to be reliably detected (confidence (statistics)), and lies typically between 1-10. The sensitivity depends on parameters like bandwidth BW or integration time τ=1/(2BW) (as explained here: NEP), because noise level can be reduced by signal averaging, usually resulting in a reduction of the noise amplitude as $N_{oi} \propto 1/\sqrt{\tau}$ where $\tau$ is the integration time over which the signal is averaged. A measure of sensitivity independent of bandwidth can be provided by using the amplitude or power spectral density of the noise and or signals ($S_i, S_o, N_{oi}$) in the definition, with units like m/Hz^{1/2}, N/Hz^{1/2}, W/Hz or V/Hz^{1/2}. For a white noise signal over the sensor bandwidth, its power spectral density can be determined from the total noise power $N_{oi,\mathrm{tot}}$ (over the full bandwidth) using the equation $N_{oi,\mathrm{PSD}}=N_{oi,\mathrm{tot}}/BW$. Its amplitude spectral density is the square-root of this value $N_{oi,\mathrm{ASD}}=\sqrt{N_{oi,\mathrm{PSD}}}$. Note that in signal processing the words energy and power are also used for quantities that do not have the unit Watt (Energy (signal processing)).

In some instruments, like spectrum analyzers, a SNR_{o} of 1 at a specified bandwidth of 1 Hz is assumed by default when defining their sensitivity. For instruments that measure power, which also includes photodetectors, this results in the sensitivity becoming equal to the noise-equivalent power and for other instruments it becomes equal to the noise-equivalent-input $NEI=N_{oi,ASD}/R$. A lower value of the sensitivity corresponds to better performance (smaller signals can be detected), which seems contrary to the common use of the word sensitivity where higher sensitivity corresponds to better performance. It has therefore been argued that it is preferable to use detectivity, which is the reciprocal of the noise-equivalent input, as a metric for the performance of detectors $D=R/N_{oi}$.

As an example, consider a piezoresistive force sensor through which a constant current runs, such that it has a responsivity $R=1.0~\mathrm{V}/\mathrm{N}$. The Johnson noise of the resistor generates a noise amplitude spectral density of $N_{oi,\textrm{ASD}}=10~\mathrm{nV}/\sqrt{\mathrm{Hz}}$. For a specified SNR_{o} of 1, this results in a sensitivity and noise-equivalent input of $S_{i,ASD}=NEI=10~\mathrm{nN}/\sqrt{\mathrm{Hz}}$ and a detectivity of $(10~\mathrm{nN}/\sqrt{\mathrm{Hz}})^{-1}$, such that an input signal of 10 nN generates the same output voltage as the noise does over a bandwidth of 1 Hz.
