= Dinaphthylene dioxide =

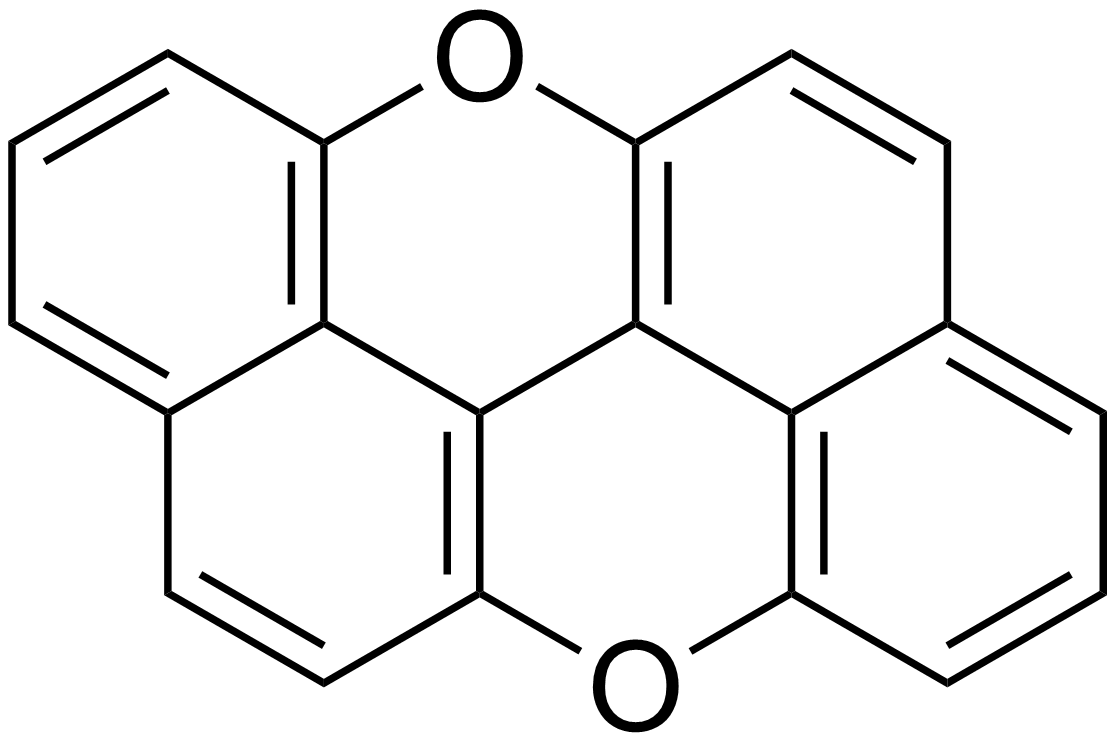
- Skeletal formula

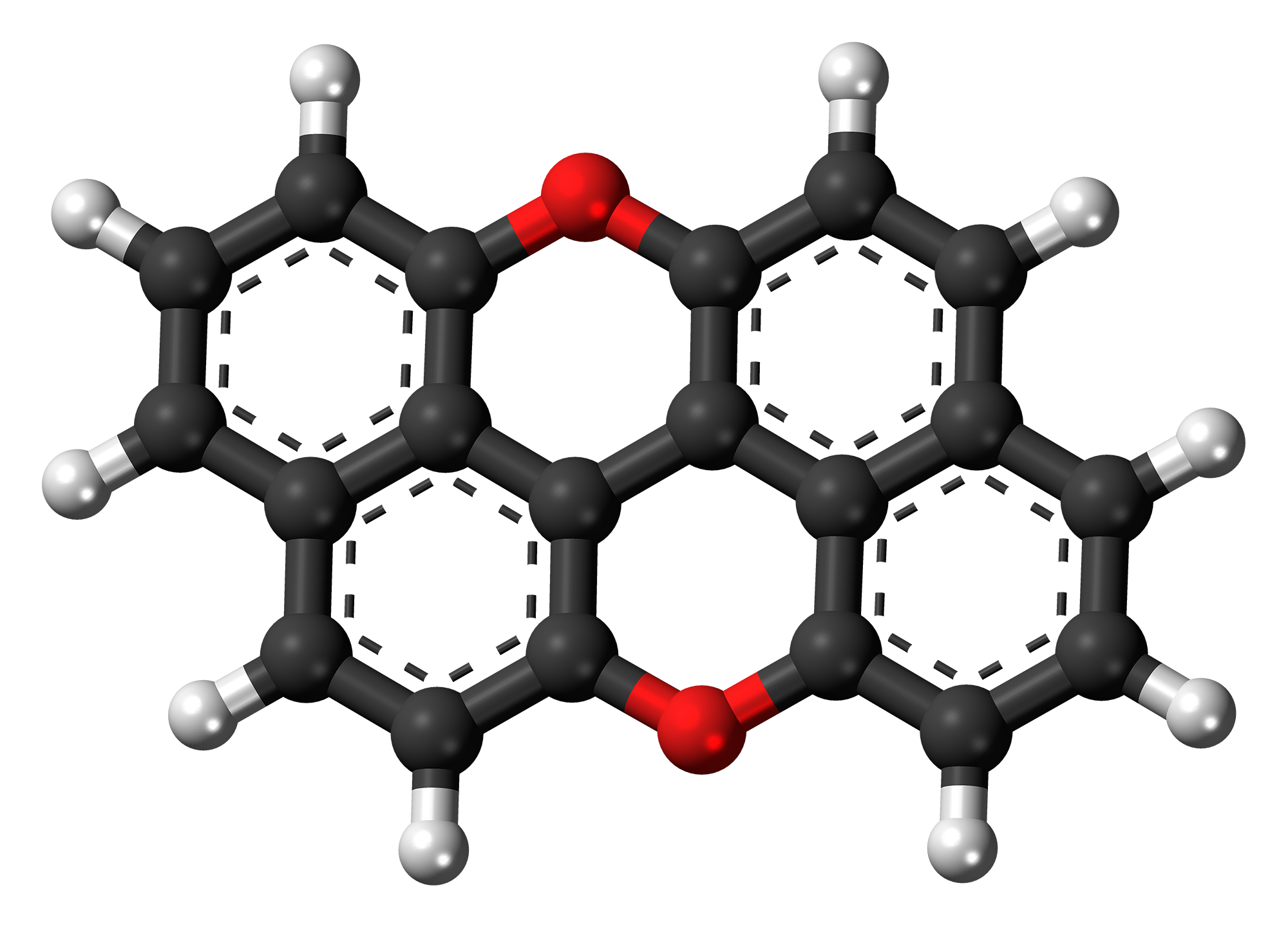
- Ball-and-stick model

Names
- Preferred IUPAC name Xantheno[2,1,9,8-klmna]xanthene
- Other names Dinaphthalene dioxide peri-Xanthenoxanthene (2,8');(8,2')-dioxo-1,1'-binaphthyl NSC47493

Identifiers
CAS Number	191-28-6
3D model (JSmol)	Interactive image
ChemSpider	210417
PubChem CID	240798
UNII	72HE489YM9
CompTox Dashboard (EPA)	DTXSID10286772
- InChI: InChI=1/C20H10O2/c1-3-11-7-9-16-19-17(11)13(5-1)21-15-10-8-12-4-2-6-14(22-16)18(12)20(15)19/h1-10H Key: AMDQVKPUZIXQFC-UHFFFAOYAZ
- SMILES: O2c1cccc5c1c4c3c2ccc6c3c(Oc4cc5)ccc6

Properties
Chemical formula	C_{20}H_{10}O_{2}
Molar mass	282.298 g·mol^{−1}
- Except where otherwise noted, data are given for materials in their standard state (at 25 °C [77 °F], 100 kPa). Infobox references

Dinaphthylene dioxide, also known as peri-xanthenoxanthene (PXX), is an organic compound used to synthesize 3,9-diphenyl-peri-xanthenoxanthene (Ph-PXX). Ph-PXX, in its soluble form, is used as organic semiconductor for thin-film transistors (TFT).

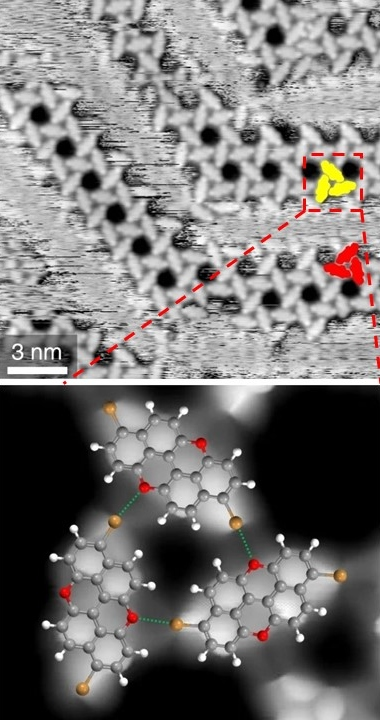
STM images of brominated PXX molecules
