= Responsivity =

Input-output gain of a detector system

Responsivity is a measure of the input–output gain of a detector system. In the specific case of a photodetector, it measures the electrical output per optical input.

A photodetector's responsivity is usually expressed in units of amperes or volts per watt of incident radiant power. For a system that responds linearly to its input, there is a unique responsivity. For nonlinear systems, the responsivity is the local slope. Many common photodetectors respond linearly as a function of the incident power.

Responsivity is a function of the wavelength of the incident radiation and of the sensor's properties, such as the bandgap of the material of which the photodetector is made. One simple expression for the responsivity R of a photodetector in which an optical signal is converted into an electric current (known as a photocurrent) is

$$R=\eta\frac{q}{hf}\approx\eta\frac{\lambda_{(\mu m)}}{1.23985(\mu m\times W/A)}$$

where $\eta$ is the quantum efficiency (the conversion efficiency of photons to electrons) of the detector for a given wavelength, $q$ is the electron charge, $f$ is the frequency of the optical signal, and $h$ is the Planck constant. This expression is also given in terms of $\lambda$, the wavelength of the optical signal, and has the unit of amperes per watt (A/W).

The term responsivity is also used to summarize input–output relationship in non-electrical systems. For example, a neuroscientist may measure how neurons in the visual pathway respond to light. In this case, responsivity summarizes the change in the neural response per unit signal strength. The responsivity in these applications can have a variety of units. The signal strength typically is controlled by varying either intensity (intensity-response function) or contrast (contrast-response function). The neural response measure depends on the part of the nervous system under study. For example, at the level of the retinal cones, the response might be in photocurrent. In the central nervous system the response is usually spikes per second. In functional neuroimaging, the response measure is usually BOLD contrast. The responsivity units reflect the relevant stimulus and physiological units.

When describing an amplifier, the more common term is gain.

Deprecated synonym sensitivity. A system's sensitivity is the inverse of the stimulus level required to produce a threshold response, with the threshold typically chosen just above the noise level.

== See also ==
- Noise-equivalent power
- Responsiveness, a related concept from interaction design / HCI.
- Specific detectivity
- Spectral sensitivity
