= Charge collection narrowing =

Narrowband photodetection

Charge collection narrowing (CCN) is a mechanism used to obtain spectrally selective (narrowband) photodetection from a semiconductor that absorbs light over a broad spectral range, without an optical filter. Instead of restricting which photons are absorbed, CCN restricts which photogenerated charge carriers are collected: the active layer is made optically thick, so that strongly absorbed photons generate carriers in a region from which they cannot be extracted, while weakly absorbed photons near the absorption edge penetrate deeper into the device and are collected. The external quantum efficiency therefore peaks near the absorption onset, and the response to the main absorption band is suppressed.

== Principle of operation ==
The absorption coefficient of a semiconductor varies with wavelength, so the depth at which light is absorbed (the penetration depth) is wavelength dependent. In a device whose charge collection efficiency is not uniform across the active layer, this converts a spectral difference into a spatial one. Carriers generated in a poorly collecting region near the illuminated contact are lost, whereas carriers generated beyond it contribute to the photocurrent. Narrowband response is obtained by matching the thickness of the absorbing layer to the spectrally dependent penetration depth of the light. The mechanism has been described as selectively collecting long-wavelength photogenerated carriers by exploiting the difference between the carrier drift length and the penetration depth of the light, giving a narrow response at the absorption cut-off edge of the active material.

Reported origins of the non-uniform collection include electrical doping of the active layer and imbalanced charge-carrier mobilities.

== History ==
CCN was introduced in 2015 by Armin and co-workers, who reported organic photodiodes with optically thick bulk heterojunctions showing sub-100 nm full width at half maximum (FWHM), visible-blind red and near-infrared responses, and named the concept charge collection narrowing. Filterless narrowband visible photodiodes based on the same principle were reported in the same year. A 2018 review of organic near-infrared photodiodes lists manipulation of internal quantum efficiency via charge collection narrowing as one of three primary strategies for narrowband organic photodiodes, alongside truly narrowband absorbers and optical cavity structures.

== Implementations ==
CCN has been applied across several material systems:

- Organic semiconductors. Thick bulk-heterojunction photodiodes; a 2025 device based on a low-bandgap random terpolymer reached an FWHM of 68 nm at 916 nm, an effect attributed to a hole mobility exceeding the electron mobility by more than an order of magnitude.
- Doped organic junctions. Intentional n-type doping of an optically thick polymer:non-fullerene blend through an electron-donating amine interlayer produced a sub-50 nm response in the near-infrared.
- Metal-halide perovskites. The mechanism has been used to make perovskite narrowband photodetectors, with the spectral position tuned through the composition-dependent bandgap.
- Wide-bandgap semiconductors. A filterless narrowband 4H-silicon carbide photodetector using a sufficiently thick absorbing layer showed an FWHM of 14.5 nm at a peak wavelength of 355 nm.

== Limitations ==
Because the mechanism works by discarding the carriers generated by strongly absorbed light, narrowband response obtained through CCN is accompanied by a reduced external quantum efficiency, and the thick absorbing layers required lead to slower response times than thin-film photodiodes of the same materials.

== Comparison with other narrowband strategies ==
Alternative routes to filterless narrowband detection include semiconductors with intrinsically narrow absorption bands, optical microcavity and light management structures, and mechanisms based on exciton dissociation rather than charge collection.

== See also ==
- Photodetector
- Photodiode
- Quantum efficiency
- Organic semiconductor
