= Organic semiconductor =

Type of semiconductor

Organic semiconductors are solids whose building blocks are pi-bonded molecules or polymers made up by carbon and hydrogen atoms and—at times—heteroatoms such as nitrogen, sulfur and oxygen. They exist in the form of molecular crystals or amorphous thin films. In general, they are electrical insulators, but become semiconducting when charges are injected from appropriate electrodes or are introduced by doping or photoexcitation.

== General properties ==
In molecular crystals the energetic separation between the top of the valence band and the bottom conduction band, i.e. the band gap, is typically 2.5–4 eV, while in inorganic semiconductors the band gaps are typically 1–2 eV. This implies that molecular crystals are, in fact, insulators rather than semiconductors in the conventional sense. They become semiconducting only when charge carriers are either injected from the electrodes or generated by intentional or unintentional doping.

Charge carriers can also be generated in the course of optical excitation. It is important to realize, however, that the primary optical excitations are neutral excitons with a Coulomb-binding energy of typically 0.5–1.0 eV. The reason is that in organic semiconductors their dielectric constants are as low as 3–4. This impedes efficient photogeneration of charge carriers in neat systems in the bulk. Efficient photogeneration can only occur in binary systems due to charge transfer between donor and acceptor moieties. Otherwise neutral excitons decay radiatively to the ground state – thereby emitting photoluminescence – or non-radiatively. The optical absorption edge of organic semiconductors is typically 1.7–3 eV, equivalent to a spectral range from 700 to 400 nm (which corresponds to the visible spectrum).

== History ==
=== Early history ===
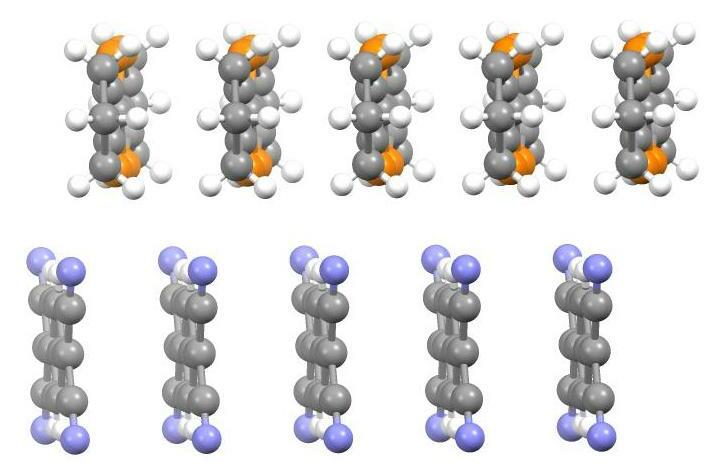
Edge-on view of portion of crystal structure of hexamethyleneTTF/TCNQ charge-transfer salt, highlighting the segregated stacking

In 1862, Henry Letheby obtained a partly conductive material by anodic oxidation of aniline in sulfuric acid. The material was probably polyaniline. In the 1950s, researchers discovered that polycyclic aromatic compounds formed semi-conducting charge-transfer complex salts with halogens. In particular, high conductivity of 0.12 S/cm was reported in perylene–iodine complex in 1954. This finding indicated that organic compounds could carry current.

The fact that organic semiconductors are, in principle, insulators but become semiconducting when charge carriers are injected from the electrode(s) was discovered by Kallmann and Pope. They found that a hole current can flow through an anthracene crystal contacted with a positively biased electrolyte containing iodine that can act as a hole injector. This work was stimulated by the earlier discovery by Akamatu et al. that aromatic hydrocarbons become conductive when blended with molecular iodine because a charge-transfer complex is formed. Since it was readily realized that the crucial parameter that controls injection is the work function of the electrode, it was straightforward to replace the electrolyte by a solid metallic or semiconducting contact with an appropriate work function. When both electrons and holes are injected from opposite contacts, they can recombine radiatively and emit light (electroluminescence). It was observed in organic crystals in 1965 by Sano et al.

In 1972, researchers found metallic conductivity in the charge-transfer complex TTF-TCNQ. Superconductivity in charge-transfer complexes was first reported in the Bechgaard salt (TMTSF)_{2}PF_{6} in 1980.

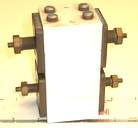
An organic polymer voltage-controlled switch from 1974. Now in the Smithsonian Chip collection

In 1973 Dr. John McGinness produced the first device incorporating an organic semiconductor. This occurred roughly eight years before the next such device was created. The "melanin (polyacetylenes) bistable switch" currently is part of the chips collection of the Smithsonian Institution.

In 1977, Shirakawa et al. reported high conductivity in oxidized and iodine-doped polyacetylene. They received the 2000 Nobel prize in Chemistry for "The discovery and development of conductive polymers". Similarly, highly conductive polypyrrole was rediscovered in 1979.

=== Organic LEDs, solar cells and FETs ===
Rigid-backbone organic semiconductors are now used as active elements in optoelectronic devices such as organic light-emitting diodes (OLED), organic solar cells, organic field-effect transistors (OFET), electrochemical transistors and recently in biosensing applications. Organic semiconductors have many advantages, such as easy fabrication, mechanical flexibility, and low cost.

The discovery by Kallman and Pope paved the way for applying organic solids as active elements in semiconducting electronic devices, such as organic light-emitting diodes (OLEDs) that rely on the recombination of electrons and holes injected from "ohmic" electrodes, i.e. electrodes with unlimited supply of charge carriers. The next major step towards the technological exploitation of the phenomenon of electron and hole injection into a non-crystalline organic semiconductor was the work by Tang and Van Slyke. They showed that efficient electroluminescence can be generated in a vapor-deposited thin amorphous bilayer of an aromatic diamine (TAPC) and Alq3 sandwiched between an indium-tin-oxide (ITO) anode and an Mg:Ag cathode. Another milestone towards the development of organic light-emitting diodes (OLEDs) was the recognition that also conjugated polymers can be used as active materials. The efficiency of OLEDs was greatly improved when realizing that phosphorescent states (triplet excitons) may be used for emission when doping an organic semiconductor matrix with a phosphorescent dye, such as complexes of iridium with strong spin–orbit coupling.

Work on conductivity of anthracene crystals contacted with an electrolyte showed that optically excited dye molecules adsorbed at the surface of the crystal inject charge carriers. The underlying phenomenon is called sensitized photoconductivity. It occurs when photo-exciting a dye molecule with appropriate oxidation/reduction potential adsorbed at the surface or incorporated in the bulk. This effect revolutionized electrophotography, which is the technological basis of today's office copying machines. It is also the basis of organic solar cells (OSCs), in which the active element is an electron donor, and an electron acceptor material is combined in a bilayer or a bulk heterojunction.

Doping with strong electron donors or acceptors can render organic solids conductive even in the absence of light. Examples are doped polyacetylene and doped light-emitting diodes.

== Materials ==
=== Amorphous molecular films ===
Amorphous molecular films are produced by evaporation or spin-coating. They have been investigated for device applications such as OLEDs, OFETs, and OSCs. Illustrative materials are tris(8-hydroxyquinolinato)aluminium, C_{60}, phenyl-C61-butyric acid methyl ester (PCBM), pentacene, carbazoles, and phthalocyanine.

=== Molecularly doped polymers ===
Molecularly doped polymers are prepared by spreading a film of an electrically inert polymer, e.g. polycarbonate, doped with typically 30% of charge transporting molecules, on a base electrode. Typical materials are the triphenylenes. They have been investigated for use as photoreceptors in electrophotography. This requires films to have a thickness of several micrometers, which can be prepared using the doctor-blade technique.

=== Molecular crystals ===
In the early days of fundamental research into organic semiconductors the prototypical materials were free-standing single crystals of the acene family, e.g. anthracene and tetracene. The advantage of employing molecular crystals instead of amorphous film is that their charge carrier mobilities are much larger. This is of particular advantage for OFET applications. Examples are thin films of crystalline rubrene prepared by hot wall epitaxy.

=== Neat polymer films ===
They are usually processed from solution employing variable deposition techniques including simple spin-coating, ink-jet deposition or industrial reel-to-reel coating which allows preparing thin films on a flexible substrate. The materials of choice are conjugated polymers such as poly-thiophene, poly-phenylenevinylene, and copolymers of alternating donor and acceptor units such as members of the poly(carbazole-dithiophene-benzothiadiazole (PCDTBT) family. For solar cell applications they can be blended with C60 or PCBM as electron acceptors.

=== Aromatic short peptides self-assemblies ===
Aromatic short peptides self-assemblies are a kind of promising candidate for bioinspired and durable nanoscale semiconductors. The highly ordered and directional intermolecular π-π interactions and hydrogen-bonding network allow the formation of quantum confined structures within the peptide self-assemblies, thus decreasing the band gaps of the superstructures into semiconductor regions. As a result of the diverse architectures and ease of modification of peptide self-assemblies, their semiconductivity can be readily tuned, doped, and functionalized. Therefore, this family of electroactive supramolecular materials may bridge the gap between the inorganic semiconductor world and biological systems.

== Characterization ==
Organic semiconductors can be characterized by UV-photoemission spectroscopy. The equivalent technique for electron states is inverse photoemission.

To measure the mobility of charge carriers, the traditional technique is the so-called time of flight (TOF) method. This technique requires relatively thick samples; it is not applicable to thin films. Alternatively, one can extract the charge carrier mobility from the current in a field effect transistor as a function of both the source-drain and the gate voltage. Other ways to determine the charge carrier mobility involve measuring space charge limited current (SCLC) flow and "carrier extraction by linearly increasing voltage (CELIV).

In order to characterize the morphology of semiconductor films, one can apply atomic force microscopy (AFM), scanning electron microscopy (SEM), and grazing-incidence small-angle scattering (GISAS).

== Charge transport ==
In contrast to organic crystals investigated in the 1960-70s, organic semiconductors that are nowadays used as active media in optoelectronic devices are usually more or less disordered. Combined with the fact that the structural building blocks are held together by comparatively weak van der Waals forces this precludes charge transport in delocalized valence and conduction bands. Instead, charge carriers are localized at molecular entities, e.g. oligomers or segments of a conjugated polymer chain, and move by incoherent hopping among adjacent sites with statistically variable energies. Quite often the site energies feature a Gaussian distribution. Also the hopping distances can vary statistically (positional disorder).

A consequence of the energetic broadening of the density of states (DOS) distribution is that charge motion is both temperature and field dependent and the charge carrier mobility can be several orders of magnitude lower than in an equivalent crystalline system. This disorder effect on charge carrier motion is diminished in organic field-effect transistors because current flow is confined in a thin layer. Therefore, the tail states of the DOS distribution are already filled so that the activation energy for charge carrier hopping is diminished. For this reason the charge carrier mobility inferred from FET experiments is always higher than that determined from TOF experiments.

In organic semiconductors, charge carriers couple to vibrational modes and are referred to as polarons. Therefore, the activation energy for hopping motion contains an additional term due to structural site relaxation upon charging a molecular entity. It turns out, however, that usually the disorder contribution to the temperature dependence of the mobility dominates over the polaronic contribution.

== Mechanical Properties ==
=== Elastic Modulus ===
The elastic modulus can be measured through tensile testing, which captures the material's stress-strain response. Additionally, the buckling method, employing buckling equations and measured wavelengths, can be used to determine the mechanical modulus of film materials. The elastic modulus significantly impacts the applications of organic semiconductors; lower moduli are preferable for wearable and flexible electronics to ensure flexibility, while higher moduli are required for devices needing greater resistance to mechanical stresses and enhanced structural integrity.

=== Yield Point ===
The yield point of organic semiconductors is the stress or strain level at which the material starts to deform permanently. After this point, the material loses its elasticity and undergoes permanent deformation. Yield strength is usually measured by conducting tensile testing. Understanding and regulating the yield point of organic semiconductors is essential to designing devices that can endure operational stress without permanent deformation. This helps maintain the device's functionality and prolong its lifetime.

=== Viscoelasticity ===
As polymers, organic semiconductors exhibit viscoelasticity, meaning they exhibit both viscous and elastic characteristics during deformation. Viscoelasticity allows materials to return to their original shape after being deformed and to exhibit strain that varies over time. Viscoelasticity is typically measured using dynamic mechanical analysis (DMA). Viscoelasticity is crucial for wearable devices, which are subjected to stretching and bending during use. The viscoelastic properties help the materials absorb energy during these processes, enhancing durability and ensuring long-term functionality under continuous physical stress.

== See also ==
- Charge collection narrowing
- Conductive polymer
- Dinaphthylene dioxide
- Molecular electronics
- Organic electronics
- Organic field-effect transistor (OFET)
- Organic laser
- Organic light-emitting diode (OLED)
- Organic photonics
- Organic photovoltaic cell (OPVC)
