= Specific detectivity =

Parameter characterizing photodetector performance

Specific detectivity, or D*, for a photodetector is a figure of merit used to characterize performance, equal to the reciprocal of noise-equivalent power (NEP), normalized per square root of the sensor's area and frequency bandwidth (reciprocal of twice the integration time).

Specific detectivity is given by $D^*=\frac{\sqrt{A}}{NEP}$, where $A$ is the area of the photosensitive region of the detector, and NEP the noise equivalent power (in units of $W/\sqrt{Hz}$). It is commonly expressed in Jones units ($cm \cdot \sqrt{Hz}/ W$) in honor of Robert Clark Jones who originally defined it.

Given that noise-equivalent power can be expressed as a function of the responsivity $\mathfrak{R}$ (in units of $A/W$ or $V/W$) and the noise spectral density $S_n$ (in units of $A/Hz^{1/2}$ or $V/Hz^{1/2}$) as $NEP=\frac{S_n}{\mathfrak{R}}$, it is common to see the specific detectivity expressed as $D^*=\frac{\mathfrak{R}\cdot\sqrt{A}}{S_n}$.

It is often useful to express the specific detectivity in terms of relative noise levels present in the device. A common expression is given below.

$$D^* = \frac{q\lambda \eta}{hc} \left[\frac{4kT}{R_0 A}+2q^2 \eta \Phi_b\right]^{-1/2}$$

With $q$ as the electronic charge, $\lambda$ is the wavelength of interest, $h$ is the Planck constant, $c$ is the speed of light, $k$ is the Boltzmann constant, $T$ is the temperature of the detector, $R_0A$ is the zero-bias dynamic resistance area product (often measured experimentally, but also expressible in noise level assumptions), $\eta$ is the quantum efficiency of the device, and $\Phi_b$ is the total flux of the source (often a blackbody) in photons/s/cm^{2}.

== Detectivity measurement ==
Detectivity can be measured from a suitable optical setup using known parameters. You will need a known light source with known irradiance at a given standoff distance. The incoming light source will be chopped at a certain frequency, and then each wavelength will be integrated over a given time constant over a given number of frames.

In detail, we compute the detection bandwidth $\Delta f$ directly from the integration time constant $t_c$.

$$\Delta f = \frac{1}{2 t_c}$$

Next, an average signal and rms noise needs to be measured from a set of $N$ frames. This is done either directly by the instrument, or done as post-processing.

$$\text{Signal}_{\text{avg}} = \frac{1}{N}\big( \sum_i^{N} \text{Signal}_i \big)$$
$$\text{Noise}_{\text{rms}} = \sqrt{\frac{1}{N}\sum_i^N (\text{Signal}_i - \text{Signal}_{\text{avg}})^2}$$

with the $NEP=\frac{\text{Noise}_{rms}}{\sqrt{\Delta f}}$. Now, the computation of the radiance $H$ in W/sr/cm^{2} must be computed where cm^{2} is the emitting area. Next, emitting area must be converted into a projected area and the solid angle; this product is often called the etendue. This step can be obviated by the use of a calibrated source, where the exact number of photons/s/cm^{2} is known at the detector. If this is unknown, it can be estimated using the black-body radiation equation, detector active area $A_d$ and the etendue. This ultimately converts the outgoing radiance of the black body in W/sr/cm^{2} of emitting area into one of W observed on the detector.

The broad-band responsivity, is then just the signal weighted by this wattage.

$$R = \frac{\text{Signal}_{\text{avg}}}{H G} = \frac{\text{Signal}_{\text{avg}}}{\int dH dA_d d\Omega_{BB}},$$

where

- $R$ is the responsivity in units of Signal / W, (or sometimes V/W or A/W),
- $H$ is the outgoing radiance from the black body (or light source) in W/sr/cm^{2} of emitting area,
- $G$ is the total integrated etendue between the emitting source and detector surface,
- $A_d$ is the detector area,
- $\Omega_{BB}$ is the solid angle of the source projected along the line connecting it to the detector surface.

From this metric noise-equivalent power can be computed by taking the noise level over the responsivity.

$$\text{NEP} = \frac{\text{Noise}_{\text{rms}}}{R \sqrt{\Delta f}}  = \frac{\text{Noise}_{\text{rms}}}{\text{Signal}_{\text{avg}}}\frac{H G}{\sqrt{\Delta f}}$$

Similarly, noise-equivalent irradiance can be computed using the responsivity in units of photons/s/W instead of in units of the signal. Now, the detectivity is simply the noise-equivalent power normalized to the bandwidth and detector area.

$$D^* = \frac{\sqrt{A_d}}{\text{NEP}} =  \frac{\sqrt{\Delta f A_d}}{H G} \frac{\text{Signal}_{\text{avg}}}{\text{Noise}_{\text{rms}}}$$

== See also ==
- Sensitivity (electronics)
