= Free spectral range =

Concept in wave optics

Free spectral range (FSR) is the spacing in optical frequency or wavelength between two successive reflected or transmitted optical intensity maxima or minima of an interferometer or diffractive optical element.

The FSR is not always represented by $\Delta\nu$ or $\Delta\lambda$, but instead is sometimes represented by just the letters FSR. The reason is that these different terms often refer to the bandwidth or linewidth of an emitted source respectively.

== In general ==
The free spectral range (FSR) of a cavity in general is given by

$$\left|\Delta\lambda_\text{FSR}\right| = \frac{2\pi}{L}\left|\left(\frac{\partial \beta}{\partial \lambda}\right)^{-1} \right|$$

or, equivalently,

$$\left|\Delta\nu_\text{FSR}\right| = \frac{2\pi}{L}\left|\left(\frac{\partial \beta}{\partial \nu}\right)^{-1}\right|$$

These expressions can be derived from the resonance condition $\Delta \beta L = 2\pi$ by expanding $\Delta \beta$ in Taylor series. Here, $\beta = k_0 n(\lambda) = \frac{2\pi}{\lambda}n(\lambda)$ is the wavevector of the light inside the cavity, $k_0$ and $\lambda$ are the wavevector and wavelength in vacuum, $n$ is the refractive index of the cavity and $L$ is the round trip length of the cavity (notice that for a standing-wave cavity, $L$ is equal to twice the physical length of the cavity).

Given that $\left|\left(\frac{\partial \beta}{\partial \lambda}\right) \right| = \frac{2\pi}{\lambda^2}\left[n(\lambda)-\lambda \frac{\partial n}{\partial \lambda}\right] = \frac{2\pi}{\lambda^2}n_g$, the FSR (in wavelength) is given by

$$\Delta\lambda_\text{FSR} = \frac{\lambda^2}{n_\text{g} L},$$

being $n_\text{g}$ is the group index of the media within the cavity. or, equivalently,

$$\Delta\nu_\text{FSR} = \frac{c}{n_\text{g} L},$$

where $c$ is the speed of light in vacuum.

If the dispersion of the material is negligible, i.e. $\frac{\partial n}{\partial \lambda }\approx 0$, then the two expressions above reduce to

$$\Delta\lambda_\text{FSR} \approx \frac{\lambda^2}{n(\lambda) L},$$

and

$$\Delta\nu_\text{FSR} \approx \frac{c}{n(\lambda) L}.$$

A simple intuitive interpretation of the FSR is that it is the inverse of the roundtrip time $T_R$:

$$T_R = \frac{n_\text{g} L}{c} = \frac{1}{\Delta\nu_\text{FSR}}.$$

In wavelength, the FSR is given by

$$\Delta\lambda_\text{FSR} = \frac{\lambda^2}{n_\text{g} L},$$

where $\lambda$ is the vacuum wavelength of light. For a linear cavity, such as the Fabry-Pérot interferometer discussed below, $L = 2 l$, where $L$ is the distance travelled by light in one roundtrip around the closed cavity, and $l$ is the length of the cavity.

== Diffraction gratings ==
The free spectral range of a diffraction grating is the largest wavelength range for a given order that does not overlap the same range in an adjacent order. If the (m + 1)-th order of $\lambda$ and m-th order of $(\lambda + \Delta \lambda)$ lie at the same angle, then

$$\Delta \lambda = \frac{\lambda}{m}.$$

== Fabry–Pérot interferometer ==
In a Fabry–Pérot interferometer or etalon, the wavelength separation between adjacent transmission peaks is called the free spectral range of the etalon and is given by

$$\Delta\lambda = \frac{\lambda_0^2}{2nl \cos\theta + \lambda_0} \approx \frac{\lambda_0^2}{2nl \cos\theta},$$

where λ_{0} is the central wavelength of the nearest transmission peak, n is the index of refraction of the cavity medium, $\theta$ is the angle of incidence, and $l$ is the thickness of the cavity. More often FSR is quoted in frequency, rather than wavelength units:

$$\Delta f \approx \frac{c}{2nl \cos\theta}.$$

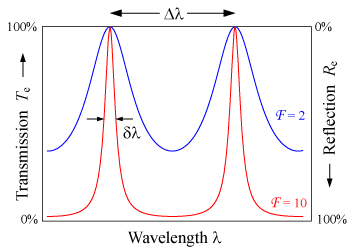
The transmission of an etalon as a function of wavelength. A high-finesse etalon (red line) shows sharper peaks and lower transmission minima than a low-finesse etalon (blue). The free spectral range is Δλ (shown above the graph).

The FSR is related to the full-width half-maximum δλ of any one transmission band by a quantity known as the finesse:

$$\mathcal{F} = \frac{\Delta\lambda}{\delta\lambda} = \frac{\pi}{2 \arcsin(1/\sqrt F)},$$

where $F = \frac{4R}{{(1 - R)^2}}$ is the coefficient of finesse, and R is the reflectivity of the mirrors.

This is commonly approximated (for R > 0.5) by

$$\mathcal{F} \approx \frac{\pi \sqrt{F}}{2} = \frac{\pi R^{1/2}}{(1 - R)}.$$
