= Noise-equivalent power =

Measure of the sensitivity of a photodetector

Noise-equivalent power (NEP) is a measure of the sensitivity of a photodetector or detector system. It is defined as the signal power that gives a signal-to-noise ratio of one in a one hertz output bandwidth. An output bandwidth of one hertz is equivalent to half a second of integration time. The units of NEP are watts per square root hertz. The NEP is equal to the noise amplitude spectral density (expressed in units of $\mathrm{A}/\sqrt{\mathrm{Hz}}$ or $\mathrm{V}/\sqrt{\mathrm{Hz}}$) divided by the responsivity (expressed in units of $\mathrm{A}/\mathrm{W}$ or $\mathrm{V}/\mathrm{W}$, respectively). The fundamental equation is $SNR = P/NEP$.

A smaller NEP corresponds to a more sensitive detector. For example, a detector with an NEP of $10^{-12} \mathrm{W}/\sqrt{\mathrm{Hz}}$ can detect a signal power of one picowatt with a signal-to-noise ratio (SNR) of one after one half second of averaging. The SNR improves as the square root of the averaging time, and hence the SNR in this example can be improved by a factor of 10 by averaging 100-times longer, i.e. for 50 seconds.

If the NEP refers to the signal power absorbed in the detector, it is known as the electrical NEP. If instead it refers to the signal power incident on the detector system, it is called the optical NEP. The optical NEP is equal to the electrical NEP divided by the optical coupling efficiency of the detector system.

== See also ==
- Noise-equivalent temperature
- Specific detectivity
