= Fabry–Pérot interferometer =

Optical device with parallel mirrors

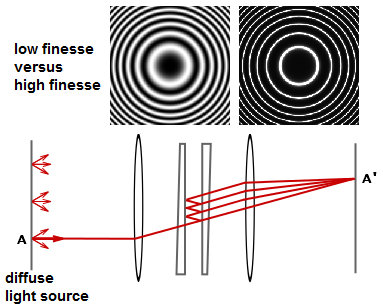
Fabry–Pérot interferometer using a pair of partially reflective, slightly wedged optical flats (in the middle), surrounded by two lenses. A single ray is traced from the source A to the screen A' through multiple reflections between the two flats. The wedge angle is highly exaggerated in this illustration; only a fraction of a degree is actually necessary to avoid ghost fringes from reflection at the rear surfaces. Low-finesse versus high-finesse images correspond to small vs. large mirror reflectivities of 4% (bare glass) and 95%, respectively.

In optics, a Fabry–Pérot interferometer (FPI), or etalon, is an optical cavity made from two parallel reflecting surfaces (mirrors). Optical waves can pass through the optical cavity only when they are in resonance with it. It is named after French physicists Charles Fabry and Alfred Perot, who developed the instrument in 1899. Etalon is from the French étalon, meaning "measuring gauge" or "standard".

Etalons are widely used in telecommunications, lasers and spectroscopy to control and measure the wavelengths of light. Recent advances in fabrication technique allow the creation of very precise tunable Fabry–Pérot interferometers. The device is technically an interferometer when the distance between the two surfaces (and with it the resonance length) can be changed, and an etalon when the distance is fixed (however, the two terms are often used interchangeably).

== Basic description ==
The heart of the Fabry–Pérot interferometer is a pair of partially reflective glass optical flats spaced micrometers to centimeters apart, with the reflective surfaces facing each other. (Alternatively, a Fabry–Pérot etalon uses a single plate with two parallel reflecting surfaces.) The flats in an interferometer are often made in a wedge shape to prevent the rear surfaces from producing interference fringes; the rear surfaces often also have an anti-reflective coating.

In a typical system, illumination is provided by a diffuse source set at the focal plane of a collimating lens. A focusing lens after the pair of flats would produce an inverted image of the source if the flats were not present; all light emitted from a point on the source is focused to a single point in the system's image plane. In the accompanying illustration, only one ray emitted from point A on the source is traced. As the ray passes through the paired flats, it is repeatedly reflected to produce multiple transmitted rays which are collected by the focusing lens and brought to point A' on the screen. The complete interference pattern takes the appearance of a set of concentric rings. The sharpness of the rings depends on the reflectivity of the flats. If the reflectivity is high, resulting in a high Q factor, monochromatic light produces a set of narrow bright rings against a dark background. A Fabry–Pérot interferometer with high Q is said to have high finesse.

== Applications ==
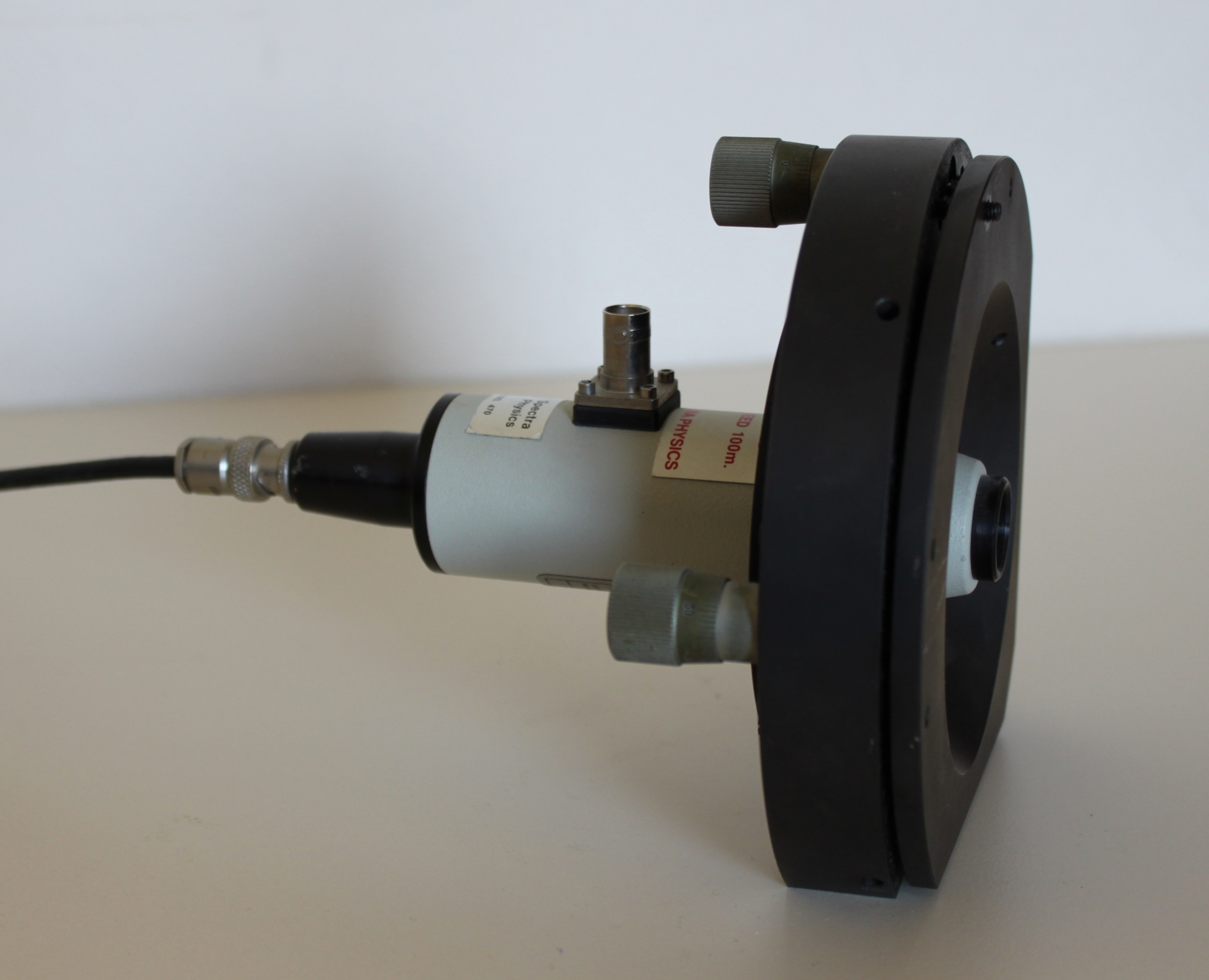
A commercial Fabry–Pérot device

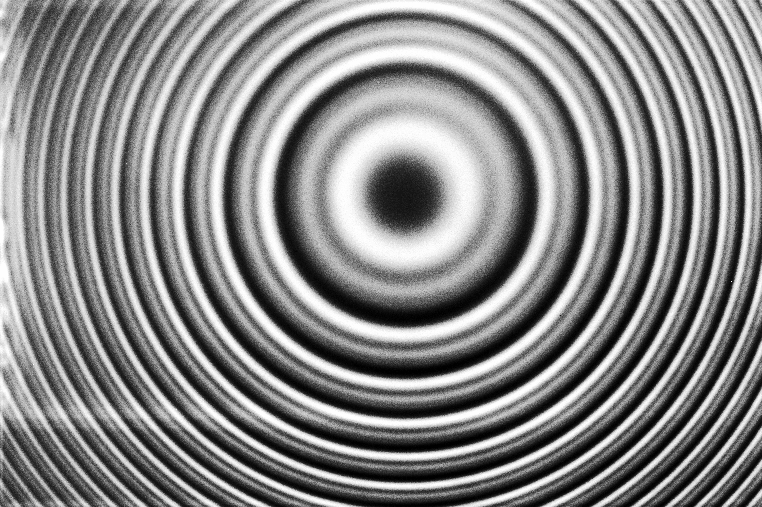
Interference fringes, showing fine structure, from a Fabry–Pérot etalon. The source is a cooled deuterium lamp.

=== Telecommunications ===
Telecommunications networks employing wavelength division multiplexing have add-drop multiplexers with banks of miniature tuned fused silica or diamond etalons. These are small iridescent cubes about 2 mm on a side, mounted in small high-precision racks. The materials are chosen to maintain stable mirror-to-mirror distances, and to keep stable frequencies even when the temperature varies. Diamond is preferred because it has greater heat conduction and still has a low coefficient of expansion. In 2005, some telecommunications equipment companies began using solid etalons that are themselves optical fibers. This eliminates most mounting, alignment and cooling difficulties.

=== Optical Instruments ===
Dichroic filters are made by depositing a series of etalonic layers on an optical surface by vapor deposition. These optical filters usually have more exact reflective and pass bands than absorptive filters. When properly designed, they run cooler than absorptive filters because they reflect unwanted wavelengths rather than absorbing them. Dichroic filters are widely used in optical equipment such as light sources, cameras, astronomical equipment, and laser systems.

Optical wavemeters and some optical spectrum analyzers use Fabry–Pérot interferometers with different free spectral ranges to determine the wavelength of light with great precision.

Laser resonators are often described as Fabry–Pérot resonators, although for many types of laser the reflectivity of one mirror is close to 100%, making it more similar to a Gires–Tournois interferometer. Semiconductor diode lasers sometimes use a true Fabry–Pérot geometry, due to the difficulty of coating the end facets of the chip. Quantum cascade lasers often employ Fabry–Pérot cavities to sustain lasing without the need for any facet coatings, due to the high gain of the active region.

Etalons are often placed inside the laser resonator when constructing single-mode lasers. Without an etalon, a laser will generally produce light over a wavelength range corresponding to a number of cavity modes, which are similar to Fabry–Pérot modes. Inserting an etalon into the laser cavity, with well-chosen finesse and free-spectral range, can suppress all cavity modes except for one, thus changing the operation of the laser from multi-mode to single-mode.

Stable Fabry–Pérot interferometers are often used to stabilize the frequency of light emitted by a laser (which often fluctuate due to mechanical vibrations or temperature changes) by means of locking it to a mode of the cavity. Many techniques exist to produce an error signal, such as the widely-used Pound–Drever–Hall technique.

=== Spectroscopy ===
Fabry–Pérot etalons can be used to prolong the interaction length in laser absorption spectrometry, particularly cavity ring-down, techniques. An etalon of increasing thickness can be used as a linear variable optical filter to achieve spectroscopy. It can be made incredibly small using thin films of nanometer thicknesses.

A Fabry–Pérot etalon can be used to make a spectrometer capable of observing the Zeeman effect, where the spectral lines are far too close together to distinguish with a normal spectrometer.

=== Astronomy ===
In astronomy an etalon is used to select a single atomic transition for imaging. The most common is the H-alpha line of the sun. The Ca-K line from the sun is also commonly imaged using etalons.

The methane sensor for Mars (MSM) aboard India's Mangalyaan is an example of a Fabry–Pérot instrument. It was the first Fabry–Pérot instrument in space when Mangalyaan launched. As it did not distinguish radiation absorbed by methane from radiation absorbed by carbon dioxide and other gases, it was later called an albedo mapper.

In gravitational wave detection, a Fabry–Pérot cavity is used to store photons for almost a millisecond while they bounce up and down between the mirrors. This increases the time a gravitational wave can interact with the light, which results in a better sensitivity at low frequencies. This principle is used by detectors such as LIGO and Virgo, which consist of a Michelson interferometer with a Fabry–Pérot cavity with a length of several kilometers in both arms. Smaller cavities, usually called mode cleaners, are used for spatial filtering and frequency stabilization of the main laser.

== Theory ==
=== Resonator losses and outcoupled light ===
The spectral response of a Fabry–Pérot resonator is based on interference between the light launched into it and the light circulating in the resonator. Constructive interference occurs if the two beams are in phase, leading to resonant enhancement of light inside the resonator. If the two beams are out of phase, only a small portion of the launched light is stored inside the resonator. The stored, transmitted, and reflected light is spectrally modified compared to the incident light.

Assume a two-mirror Fabry–Pérot resonator of geometrical length $\ell$, homogeneously filled with a medium of refractive index $n$. Light is launched into the resonator under normal incidence. The round-trip time $t_{\rm RT}$ of light travelling in the resonator with speed $c = c_0/n$, where $c_0$ is the speed of light in vacuum, and the free spectral range $\Delta \nu_{\rm FSR}$ are given by

$$t_{\rm RT} = \frac{1}{\Delta \nu_{\rm FSR}} = \frac{2 \ell}{c}.$$

The electric-field and intensity reflectivities $r_i$ and $R_i$, respectively, at mirror $i$ are

$$|r_i|^2 = R_i.$$

If there are no other resonator losses, the decay of light intensity per round trip is quantified by the outcoupling decay-rate constant $1 / \tau_{\rm out},$

$$R_1 R_2 = e^{- t_{\rm RT} / \tau_{\rm out}},$$

and the photon-decay time $\tau_c$ of the resonator is then given by

$$\frac{1}{\tau_c} = \frac{1}{\tau_{\rm out}} = \frac{-\ln{(R_1 R_2)}}{t_{\rm RT}}.$$

=== Resonance frequencies and spectral line shapes ===
With $\phi(\nu)$ quantifying the single-pass phase shift that light exhibits when propagating from one mirror to the other, the round-trip phase shift at frequency $\nu$ accumulates to

$$2 \phi (\nu) = 2 \pi \nu t_{\rm RT}.$$

Resonances occur at frequencies at which light exhibits constructive interference after one round trip. Each resonator mode with its mode index $q$, where $q$ is an integer in the interval $[ -\infty , \infty ]$, is associated with a resonance frequency $\nu_q$ and wavenumber $k_q$,

$$\nu_q = q \Delta \nu_{\rm FSR} \Rightarrow k_q = \frac{2 \pi q \Delta \nu_{\rm FSR}}{c}.$$

Two modes with opposite values $\pm q$ and $\pm k$ of modal index and wavenumber, respectively, physically representing opposite propagation directions, occur at the same absolute value $\left| \nu_q \right|$ of frequency.

The decaying electric field at frequency $\nu_q$ is represented by a damped harmonic oscillation with an initial amplitude of $E_{q,s}$ and a decay-time constant of $2 \tau_c$. In phasor notation, it can be expressed as

$$E_q(t) = E_{q,s} e^{i 2 \pi \nu_q t} e^{-\frac{t}{2 \tau_c}}.$$

Fourier transformation of the electric field in time provides the electric field per unit frequency interval,

$$\tilde E_q (\nu) = \int_{-\infty}^{+\infty} E_q(t) e^{-i 2 \pi \nu t}\,dt = E_{q,s} \frac{1}{(2 \tau_c )^{-1} + i 2 \pi (\nu - \nu_q)}.$$

Each mode has a normalized spectral line shape per unit frequency interval given by

$$\tilde \gamma_q (\nu) = \frac{1}{\tau_c} \left| {\frac{\tilde E_q (\nu)}{ E_{q,s}}} \right|^2 = \frac{1}{\tau_c} \frac{1}{(2 \tau_c )^{-2} + 4 \pi^2 (\nu - \nu_q)^2},$$

whose frequency integral is unity. Introducing the full width at half maximum (FWHM) linewidth $\Delta \nu_c$ of the Lorentzian spectral line shape, we obtain

$$\Delta \nu_c = \frac{1}{2 \pi \tau_c} \Rightarrow \tilde \gamma_q (\nu) = \frac{1}{\pi} \frac{\Delta \nu_c / 2}{(\Delta \nu_c / 2)^2 + (\nu - \nu_q)^2} = \frac{2}{\pi} \frac{\Delta \nu_c}{(\Delta \nu_c)^2 + 4 (\nu - \nu_q)^2},$$

expressed in terms of either the half-width-at-half-maximum (HWHM) linewidth $\Delta \nu_c / 2$ or the FWHM linewidth $\Delta \nu_c$. Calibrated to a peak height of unity, we obtain the Lorentzian lines:

$$\gamma_{q,L} (\nu) = \frac{\pi}{2} \Delta \nu_c \tilde \gamma_q (\nu) = \frac{(\Delta \nu_c / 2)^2}{(\Delta \nu_c / 2)^2 + (\nu - \nu_q)^2} = \frac{(\Delta \nu_c)^2}{(\Delta \nu_c)^2 + 4 (\nu - \nu_q)^2}.$$

When repeating the above Fourier transformation for all the modes with mode index $q$ in the resonator, one obtains the full mode spectrum of the resonator.

Since the linewidth $\Delta \nu_c$ and the free spectral range $\Delta \nu_{\rm FSR}$ are independent of frequency, whereas in wavelength space the linewidth cannot be properly defined and the free spectral range depends on wavelength, and since the resonance frequencies $\nu_q$ scale proportional to frequency, the spectral response of a Fabry–Pérot resonator is naturally analyzed and displayed in frequency space.

=== Generic Airy distribution: The internal resonance enhancement factor ===
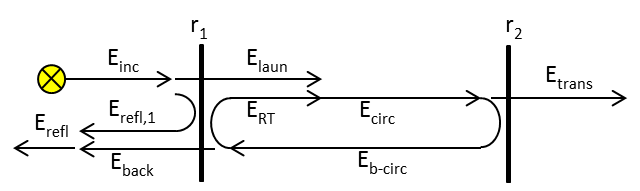
Electric fields in a Fabry–Pérot resonator. The electric-field mirror reflectivities are $r_1$ and $r_2$. Indicated are the characteristic electric fields produced by an electric field $E_{\rm inc}$ incident upon mirror 1: $E_{\rm refl,1}$ initially reflected at mirror 1, $E_{\rm laun}$ launched through mirror 1, $E_{\rm circ}$ and $E_\text{b-circ}$ circulating inside the resonator in forward and backward propagation direction, respectively, $E_{\rm RT}$ propagating inside the resonator after one round trip, $E_{\rm trans}$ transmitted through mirror 2, $E_{\rm back}$ transmitted through mirror 1, and the total field $E_{\rm refl}$ propagating backward. Interference occurs at the left- and right-hand sides of mirror 1 between $E_{\rm refl,1}$ and $E_{\rm back}$, resulting in $E_{\rm refl}$, and between $E_{\rm laun}$ and $E_{\rm RT}$, resulting in $E_{\rm circ}$, respectively.

The response of the Fabry–Pérot resonator to an electric field incident upon mirror 1 is described by several Airy distributions (named after the mathematician and astronomer George Biddell Airy) that quantify the light intensity in forward or backward propagation direction at different positions inside or outside the resonator with respect to either the launched or incident light intensity. The response of the Fabry–Pérot resonator is most easily derived by use of the circulating-field approach. This approach assumes a steady state and relates the various electric fields to each other (see figure "Electric fields in a Fabry–Pérot resonator").

The field $E_{\rm circ}$ can be related to the field $E_{\rm laun}$ that is launched into the resonator by

$$E_{\rm circ} = E_{\rm laun} + E_{\rm RT} = E_{\rm laun} + r_1 r_2 e^{-i 2 \phi} E_{\rm circ} \Rightarrow \frac{E_{\rm circ}}{E_{\rm laun}} = \frac{1}{1 - r_1 r_2 e^{-i 2 \phi}}.$$

The generic Airy distribution, which considers solely the physical processes exhibited by light inside the resonator, then derives as the intensity circulating in the resonator relative to the intensity launched,

$$A_{\rm circ} = \frac{I_{\rm circ}}{I_{\rm laun}} = \frac{\left| E_{\rm circ} \right|^2}{\left| E_{\rm laun} \right|^2} = \frac{1}{\left| 1 - r_1 r_2 e^{-i 2 \phi} \right|^2} = \frac{1}{\left( {1 - \sqrt{R_1 R_2}} \right)^2 + 4 \sqrt{R_1 R_2} \sin^2(\phi)}.$$

$A_{\rm circ}$ represents the spectrally dependent internal resonance enhancement which the resonator provides to the light launched into it (see figure "Resonance enhancement in a Fabry–Pérot resonator"). At the resonance frequencies $\nu_q$, where $\sin(\phi)$ equals zero, the internal resonance enhancement factor is

$$A_{\rm circ}(\nu_q) = \frac{1}{\left( 1 - \sqrt{R_1 R_2} \right)^2}.$$

=== Other Airy distributions ===
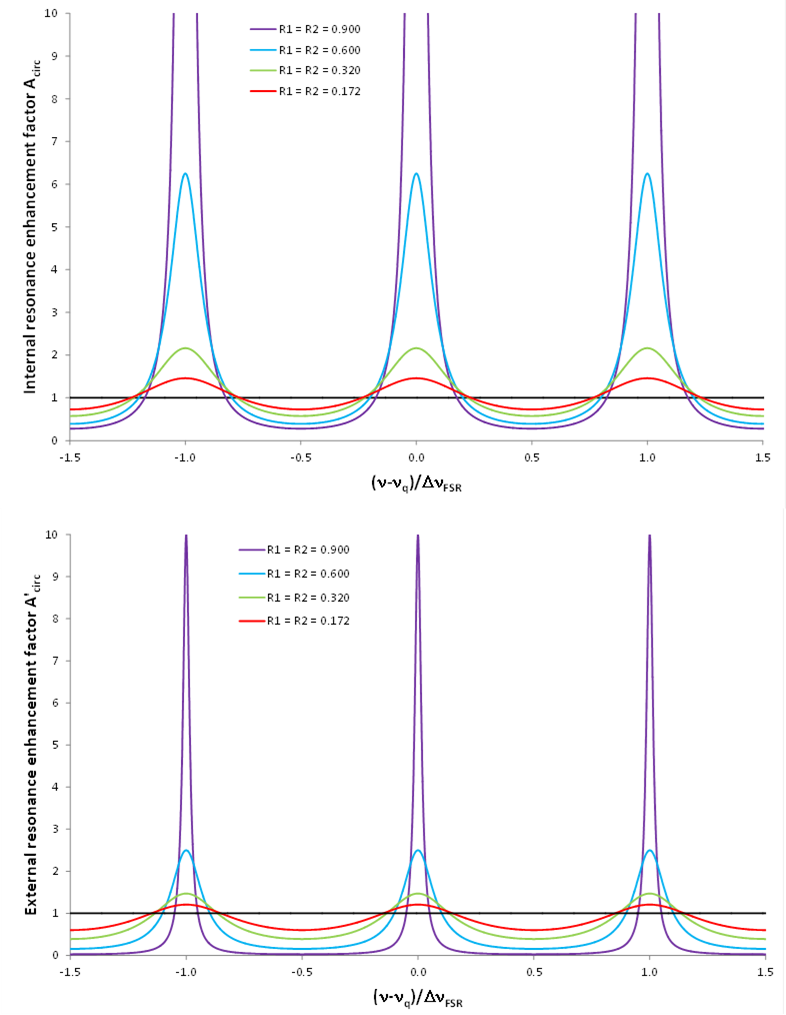
Resonance enhancement in a Fabry–Pérot resonator. (top) Spectrally dependent internal resonance enhancement, equaling the generic Airy distribution $A_\text{circ}$. Light launched into the resonator is resonantly enhanced by this factor. For the curve with $R_1 = R_2 = 0.9$, the peak value is at $A_\text{circ}(\nu_q) = 100$, outside the scale of the ordinate. (bottom) Spectrally dependent external resonance enhancement, equaling the Airy distribution $A_\text{circ}^{\prime}$. Light incident upon the resonator is resonantly enhanced by this factor.

Once the internal resonance enhancement, the generic Airy distribution, is established, all other Airy distributions can be deduced by simple scaling factors. Since the intensity launched into the resonator equals the transmitted fraction of the intensity incident upon mirror 1,

$$I_\text{laun} = \left(1 - R_1 \right) I_\text{inc},$$

and the intensities transmitted through mirror 2, reflected at mirror 2, and transmitted through mirror 1 are the transmitted and reflected/transmitted fractions of the intensity circulating inside the resonator,

$$\begin{align}
I_\text{trans} &= \left(1 - R_2\right) I_\text{circ}, \\
I_\text{b-circ} &= R_2 I_\text{circ}, \\
I_\text{back} &= \left(1 - R_1\right) I_\text{b-circ},
\end{align}$$

respectively, the other Airy distributions $A$ with respect to launched intensity $I_\text{laun}$ and $A^{\prime}$ with respect to incident intensity $I_\text{inc}$ are

$$\begin{align}
A_\text{circ} &= \frac{1}{R_2} A_\text{b-circ} = \frac{1}{R_1 R_2} A_\text{RT}
= \frac{1}{1 - R_2} A_\text{trans} = \frac{1}{(1 - R_1) R_2} A_\text{back}
= \frac{1}{1 - R_1 R_2} A_\text{emit}, \\
A_\text{circ}' &= \frac{1}{R_2} A_\text{b-circ}'
= \frac{1}{R_1 R_2} A_\text{RT}' = \frac{1}{1 - R_2} A_\text{trans}'
= \frac{1}{(1 - R_1) R_2} A_\text{back}'
= \frac{1}{1 - R_1 R_2} A_\text{emit}', \\
A_\text{circ}' &= \left(1 - R_1\right) A_\text{circ}.
\end{align}$$

The index "emit" denotes Airy distributions that consider the sum of intensities emitted on both sides of the resonator.

The back-transmitted intensity $I_\text{back}$ cannot be measured, because also the initially back-reflected light adds to the backward-propagating signal. The measurable case of the intensity resulting from the interference of both backward-propagating electric fields results in the Airy distribution

$$A_\text{refl}^{\prime} =
\frac{I_\text{refl}}{I_\text{inc}} =
\frac{\left| E_\text{refl} \right|^2}{\left| E_\text{inc} \right|^2} =
\frac{\left( {\sqrt{R_1} - \sqrt{R_2}} \right)^2 + 4 \sqrt{R_1 R_2} \sin^2(\phi)}{\left( {1 - \sqrt{R_1 R_2}} \right)^2 + 4 \sqrt{R_1 R_2} \sin^2(\phi)}.$$

It can be easily shown that in a Fabry–Pérot resonator, despite the occurrence of constructive and destructive interference, energy is conserved at all frequencies:

$$A_\text{trans}^{\prime} + A_\text{refl}^{\prime} = \frac{I_\text{trans} + I_\text{refl}}{I_\text{inc}} = 1.$$

The external resonance enhancement factor (see figure "Resonance enhancement in a Fabry–Pérot resonator") is

$$A_\text{circ}^{\prime} =
\frac{I_\text{circ}}{I_\text{inc}} =
(1 - R_1) A_\text{circ} =
\frac{1 - R_1}{\left( {1 - \sqrt{R_1 R_2}} \right)^2 + 4 \sqrt{R_1 R_2} \sin^2(\phi)}.$$

At the resonance frequencies $\nu_q$, where $\sin(\phi)$ equals zero, the external resonance enhancement factor is

$$A_\text{circ}^{\prime}(\nu_q) = \frac{1 - R_1}{\left( 1 - \sqrt{R_1 R_2} \right)^2}.$$

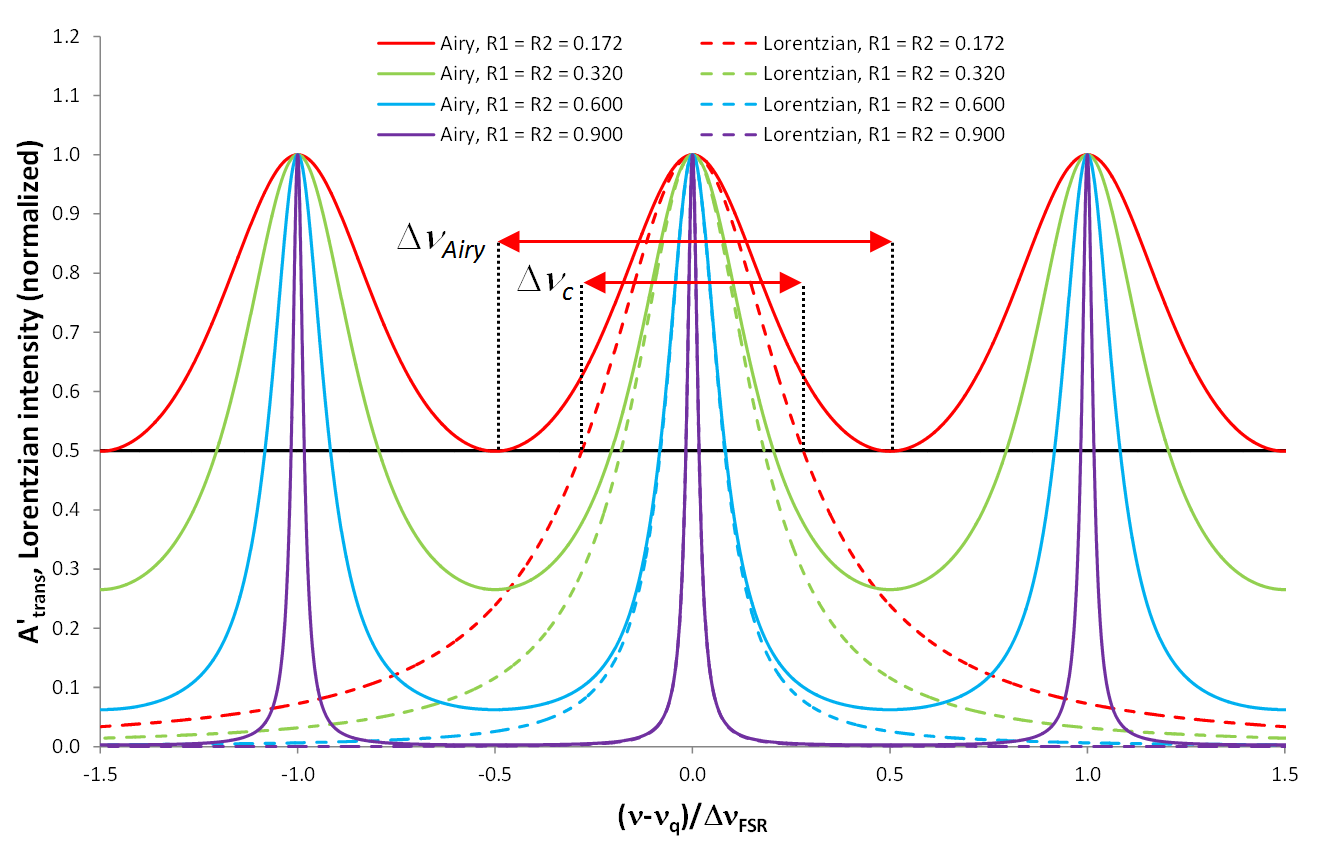
Airy distribution $A_\text{trans}^{\prime}$ (solid lines), corresponding to light transmitted through a Fabry–Pérot resonator, calculated for different values of the reflectivities $R_1 = R_2$, and comparison with a single Lorentzian line (dashed lines) calculated for the same $R_1 = R_2$. At half maximum (black line), with decreasing reflectivities the FWHM linewidth $\Delta \nu_\text{Airy}$ of the Airy distribution broadens compared to the FWHM linewidth $\Delta \nu_c$ of its corresponding Lorentzian line: $R_1 = R_2 = 0.9, 0.6, 0.32, 0.172$ results in $\Delta \nu_\text{Airy} / \Delta \nu_c = 1.001, 1.022, 1.132, 1.717$, respectively.

Usually light is transmitted through a Fabry–Pérot resonator. Therefore, an often applied Airy distribution is

$$A_\text{trans}^{\prime} =
\frac{I_\text{trans}}{I_\text{inc}} =
(1 - R_1) (1 - R_2) A_\text{circ} =
\frac{(1 - R_1) (1 - R_2)}{\left( {1 - \sqrt{R_1 R_2}} \right)^2 + 4 \sqrt{R_1 R_2} \sin^2(\phi)}.$$

It describes the fraction $I_\text{trans}$ of the intensity $I_\text{inc}$ of a light source incident upon mirror 1 that is transmitted through mirror 2 (see figure "Airy distribution $A_\text{trans}^{\prime}$"). Its peak value at the resonance frequencies $\nu_q$ is

$$A_\text{trans}^{\prime} (\nu_q) = \frac{(1 - R_1) (1 - R_2)}{\left( {1 - \sqrt{R_1 R_2}} \right)^2}.$$

For $R_1 = R_2$ the peak value equals unity; i.e., all light incident upon the resonator is transmitted. Consequently, no light is reflected, $A_\text{refl}^{\prime} = 0$, as a result of destructive interference between the fields $E_{\text{refl},1}$ and $E_\text{back}$.

$A_\text{trans}^{\prime}$ has been derived in the circulating-field approach by considering an additional phase shift of $e^{i\pi / 2}$ during each transmission through a mirror,

$$\begin{align}
E_\text{circ} = it_1E_\text{inc} + r_1 r_2 e^{-i2\phi}E_\text{circ}
&\Rightarrow \frac{E_\text{circ}}{E_\text{inc}} = \frac{it_1}{1 - r_1 r_2 e^{-i2\phi}}, \\
E_\text{trans} = it_2 E_\text{circ} e^{-i\phi}
&\Rightarrow \frac{E_\text{trans}}{E_\text{inc}} = \frac{-t_1 t_2 e^{-i \phi}}{1 - r_1 r_2 e^{-i2\phi}},
\end{align}$$

resulting in

$$A_\text{trans}^{\prime} =
\frac{I_\text{trans}}{I_\text{inc}} =
\frac{\left| E_\text{trans} \right|^2}{\left| E_\text{inc} \right|^2} =
\frac{\left| - t_1 t_2 e^{-i \phi} \right|^2}{\left| 1 - r_1 r_2 e^{-i 2 \phi} \right|^2} =
\frac{(1 - R_1) (1 - R_2)}{\left( {1 - \sqrt{R_1 R_2}} \right)^2 + 4 \sqrt{R_1 R_2} \sin^2(\phi)}.$$

Alternatively, $A_\text{trans}^{\prime}$ can be obtained via the round-trip-decay approach by tracing the infinite number of round trips that the incident electric field $E_\text{inc}$ exhibits after entering the resonator and accumulating the electric field $E_\text{trans}$ transmitted in all round trips. The field transmitted after the first propagation and the smaller and smaller fields transmitted after each consecutive propagation through the resonator are

$$\begin{align}
E_\text{trans,1} &= E_\text{inc}it_1 it_2 e^{-i \phi} = -E_\text{inc} t_1 t_2 e^{-i\phi}, \\
E_{\text{trans},m+1} &= E_{\text{trans},m}r_1 r_2 e^{-i2\phi},
\end{align}$$

respectively. Exploiting

$$\sum_{m=0}^\infty x^m =
\frac{1}{1 - x} \Rightarrow E_\text{trans} =
\sum_{m=1}^\infty E_{\text{trans},m} =
E_\text{inc} \frac{- t_1 t_2 e^{-i \phi}}{1 - r_1 r_2 e^{-i 2 \phi}}$$

results in the same $E_\text{trans} / E_\text{inc}$ as above, therefore the same Airy distribution $A_\text{trans}^{\prime}$ derives. However, this approach is physically misleading, because it assumes that interference takes place between the outcoupled beams after mirror 2, outside the resonator, rather than the launched and circulating beams after mirror 1, inside the resonator. Since it is interference that modifies the spectral contents, the spectral intensity distribution inside the resonator would be the same as the incident spectral intensity distribution, and no resonance enhancement would occur inside the resonator.

=== Airy distribution as a sum of mode profiles ===
Physically, the Airy distribution is the sum of mode profiles of the longitudinal resonator modes. Starting from the electric field $E_{circ}$ circulating inside the resonator, one considers the exponential decay in time of this field through both mirrors of the resonator, Fourier transforms it to frequency space to obtain the normalized spectral line shapes $\tilde \gamma_q (\nu)$, divides it by the round-trip time $t_{\rm RT}$ to account for how the total circulating electric-field intensity is longitudinally distributed in the resonator and coupled out per unit time, resulting in the emitted mode profiles,

$$\gamma_{q,{\rm emit}}(\nu) = \frac{1}{t_{\rm RT}} \tilde \gamma_q (\nu),$$

and then sums over the emitted mode profiles of all longitudinal modes

$$\sum_{q=-\infty}^\infty \gamma_{q,{\rm emit}}(\nu) = \frac{1 - R_1 R_2}{\left( {1 - \sqrt{R_1 R_2}} \right)^2 + 4 \sqrt{R_1 R_2} \sin^2(\phi)} = A_{\rm emit},$$

thus equaling the Airy distribution $A_{\rm emit}$.

The same simple scaling factors that provide the relations between the individual Airy distributions also provide the relations among $\gamma_{q,{\rm emit}}(\nu)$ and the other mode profiles:

$$\gamma_{q,{\rm circ}} = \frac{1}{R_2} \gamma_{q,\text{b-circ}} = \frac{1}{R_1 R_2} \gamma_{q,{\rm RT}} = \frac{1}{1 - R_2} \gamma_{q,{\rm trans}} = \frac{1}{(1 - R_1) R_2} \gamma_{q, {\rm back}} = \frac{1}{1 - R_1 R_2} \gamma_{q,{\rm emit}},$$
$$\gamma_{q,{\rm circ}}^{\prime} = \frac{1}{R_2} \gamma_{q,\text{b-circ}}^{\prime} = \frac{1}{R_1 R_2} \gamma_{q,{\rm RT}}^{\prime} = \frac{1}{1 - R_2} \gamma_{q,{\rm trans}}^{\prime} = \frac{1}{(1 - R_1) R_2} \gamma_{q, {\rm back}}^{\prime} = \frac{1}{1 - R_1 R_2} \gamma_{q,{\rm emit}}^{\prime},$$
$$\gamma_{q,{\rm circ}}^{\prime} = (1 - R_1) \gamma_{q,{\rm circ}}.$$

=== Characterizing the Fabry–Pérot resonator: Lorentzian linewidth and finesse ===
The Taylor criterion of spectral resolution proposes that two spectral lines can be resolved if the individual lines cross at half intensity. When launching light into the Fabry–Pérot resonator, by measuring the Airy distribution, one can derive the total loss of the Fabry–Pérot resonator via recalculating the Lorentzian linewidth $\Delta \nu_c$, displayed (blue line) relative to the free spectral range in the figure "Lorentzian linewidth and finesse versus Airy linewidth and finesse of a Fabry–Pérot resonator".

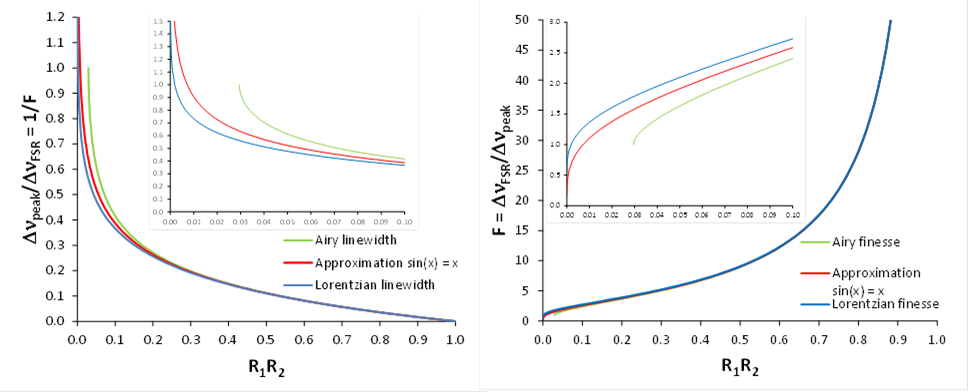
Lorentzian linewidth and finesse versus Airy linewidth and finesse of a Fabry–Pérot resonator. [Left] Relative Lorentzian linewidth $\Delta \nu_c / \Delta \nu_{\rm FSR}$ (blue curve), relative Airy linewidth $\Delta \nu_{\rm Airy} / \Delta \nu_{\rm FSR}$ (green curve), and its approximation (red curve). [Right] Lorentzian finesse $\mathcal{F}_c$ (blue curve), Airy finesse $\mathcal{F}_{\rm Airy}$ (green curve), and its approximation (red curve) as a function of reflectivity value $R_1 R_2$. The exact solutions of the Airy linewidth and finesse (green lines) correctly break down at $\Delta \nu_{\rm Airy} = \Delta \nu_{\rm FSR}$, equivalent to $\mathcal{F}_{\rm Airy} = 1$, whereas their approximations (red lines) incorrectly do not break down. Insets: Region $R_1 R_2 < 0.1$.

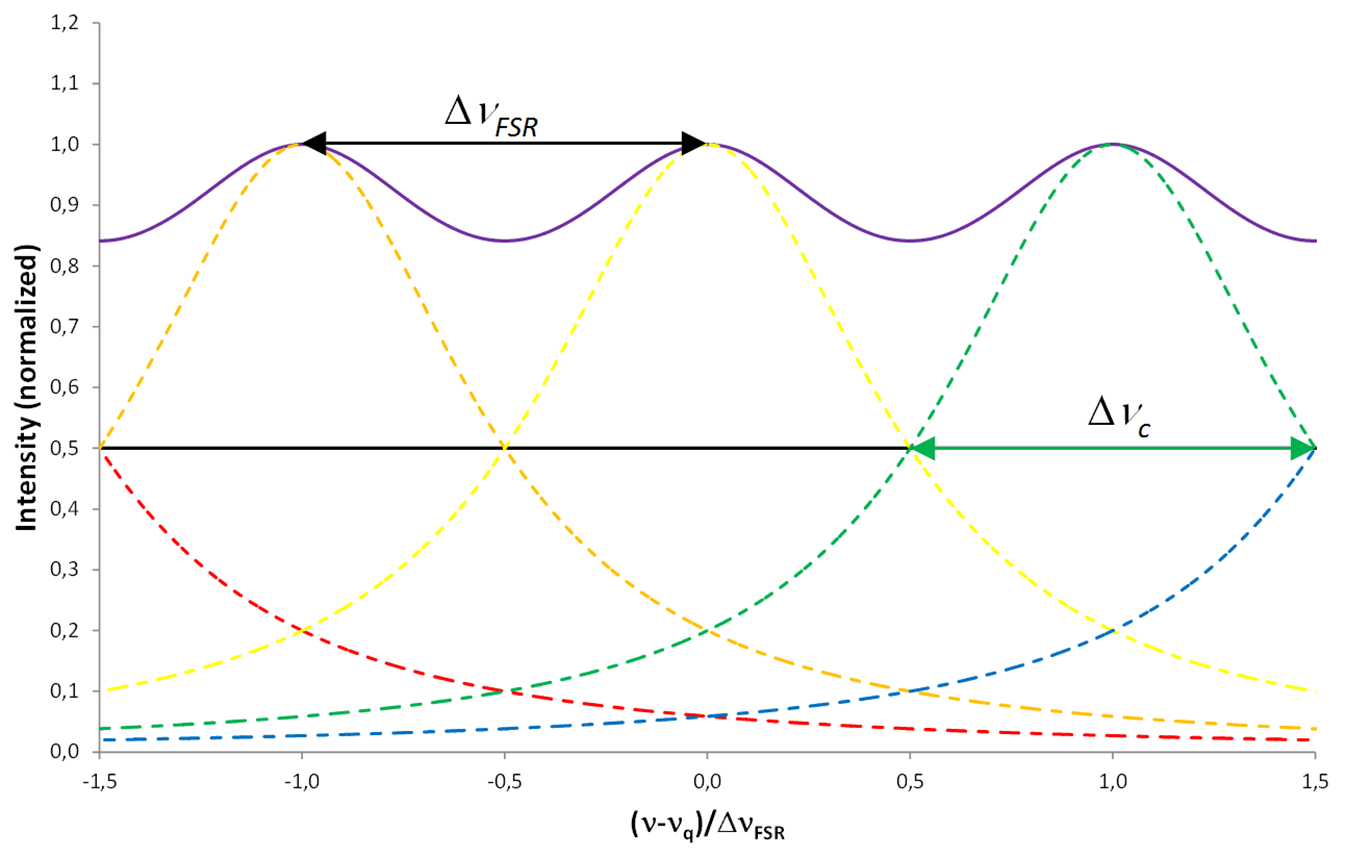
The physical meaning of the Lorentzian finesse $\mathcal{F}_c$ of a Fabry–Pérot resonator. Displayed is the situation for $R_1 = R_2 \approx 4.32\%$, at which $\Delta \nu_c = \Delta \nu_{\rm FSR}$ and $\mathcal{F}_c = 1$, i.e., two adjacent Lorentzian lines (dashed colored lines, only 5 lines are shown for clarity for each resonance frequency,$\nu_{q}$) cross at half maximum (solid black line) and the Taylor criterion for spectrally resolving two peaks in the resulting Airy distribution (solid purple line, the sum of 5 lines which has been normalized to the peak intensity of itself) is reached.

The underlying Lorentzian lines can be resolved as long as the Taylor criterion is obeyed (see figure "The physical meaning of the Lorentzian finesse"). Consequently, one can define the Lorentzian finesse of a Fabry–Pérot resonator:

$$\mathcal{F}_c = \frac{\Delta \nu_{\rm FSR}}{\Delta \nu_c} = \frac{2 \pi}{- \ln(R_1 R_2)}.$$

It is displayed as the blue line in the figure "The physical meaning of the Lorentzian finesse". The Lorentzian finesse $\mathcal{F}_c$ has a fundamental physical meaning: it describes how well the Lorentzian lines underlying the Airy distribution can be resolved when measuring the Airy distribution. At the point where

$$\Delta \nu_c = \Delta \nu_{\rm FSR} \Rightarrow R_1 R_2 = e^{-2 \pi} \approx 0.001867,$$

equivalent to $\mathcal{F}_c = 1$, the Taylor criterion for the spectral resolution of a single Airy distribution is reached. Under this point, $\mathcal{F}_c < 1$, two spectral lines cannot be distinguished. For equal mirror reflectivities, this point occurs when $R_1 = R_2 \approx 4.32\%$. Therefore, the linewidth of the Lorentzian lines underlying the Airy distribution of a Fabry–Pérot resonator can be resolved by measuring the Airy distribution, hence its resonator losses can be spectroscopically determined, until this point.

=== Scanning the Fabry–Pérot resonator: Airy linewidth and finesse ===
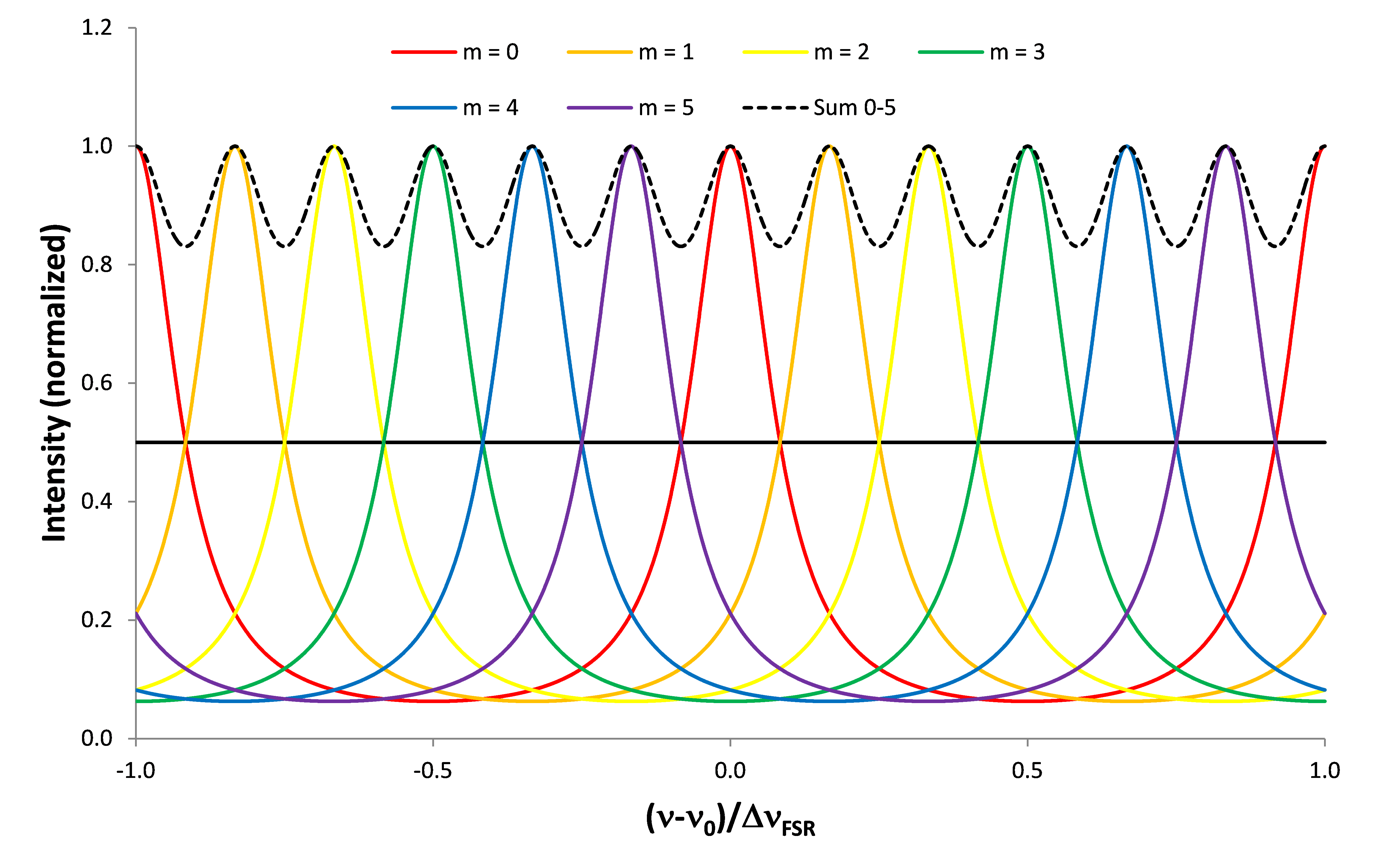
The physical meaning of the Airy finesse $\mathcal{F}_{\rm Airy}$ of a Fabry–Pérot resonator. When scanning the Fabry–Pérot length (or the angle of incident light), Airy distributions (colored solid lines) are created by signals at individual frequencies. The experimental result of the measurement is the sum of the individual Airy distributions (black dashed line). If the signals occur at frequencies $\nu_m = \nu_q + m \Delta \nu_{\rm Airy}$, where $m$ is an integer starting at $q$, the Airy distributions at adjacent frequencies are separated from each other by the linewidth $\Delta \nu_{\rm Airy}$, thereby fulfilling the Taylor criterion for the spectroscopic resolution of two adjacent peaks. The maximum number of signals that can be resolved is $\mathcal{F}_{\rm Airy}$. Since in this specific example the reflectivities $R_1 = R_2 = 0.59928$ have been chosen such that $\mathcal{F}_{\rm Airy} = 6$ is an integer, the signal for $m = \mathcal{F}_{\rm Airy}$ at the frequency $\nu_q + \mathcal{F}_{\rm Airy} \Delta \nu_{\rm Airy} = \nu_q + \Delta \nu_{\rm FSR}$ coincides with the signal for $m = q$ at $\nu_q$. In this example, a maximum of $\mathcal{F}_{\rm Airy} = 6$ peaks can be resolved when applying the Taylor criterion.

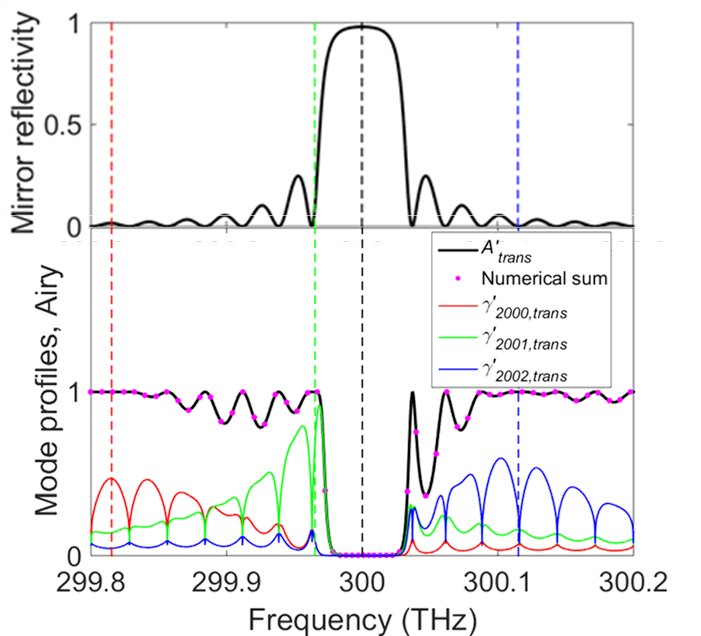
Example of a Fabry–Pérot resonator with (top) frequency-dependent mirror reflectivity and (bottom) the resulting distorted mode profiles $\gamma_{q,{\rm trans}}^{\prime}$ of the modes with indices $q = 2000, 2001, 2002$, the sum of 6 million mode profiles (pink dots, displayed for a few frequencies only), and the Airy distribution $A_{\rm trans}^{\prime}$. The vertical dashed lines denote the maximum of the reflectivity curve (black) and the resonance frequencies of the individual modes (colored).

When the Fabry–Pérot resonator is used as a scanning interferometer, i.e., at varying resonator length (or angle of incidence), one can spectroscopically distinguish spectral lines at different frequencies within one free spectral range. Several Airy distributions $A_{\rm trans}^{\prime}(\nu)$, each one created by an individual spectral line, must be resolved. Therefore, the Airy distribution becomes the underlying fundamental function and the measurement delivers a sum of Airy distributions. The parameters that properly quantify this situation are the Airy linewidth $\Delta \nu_{\rm Airy}$ and the Airy finesse $\mathcal{F}_{\rm Airy}$. The FWHM linewidth $\Delta \nu _{\rm Airy}$ of the Airy distribution $A_{\rm trans}^{\prime}(\nu)$ is

$$\Delta \nu_{\rm Airy} = \Delta \nu_{\rm FSR} \frac{2}{\pi} \arcsin \left( \frac{1 - \sqrt{R_1 R_2}}{2 \sqrt[4]{R_1 R_2}} \right).$$

The Airy linewidth $\Delta \nu_{\rm Airy}$ is displayed as the green curve in the figure "Lorentzian linewidth and finesse versus Airy linewidth and finesse of a Fabry–Pérot resonator".

The concept of defining the linewidth of the Airy peaks as FWHM breaks down at $\Delta \nu _{\rm Airy} = \Delta \nu_{\rm FSR}$ (solid red line in the figure "Airy distribution $A_{\rm trans}^{\prime}$"), because at this point the Airy linewidth instantaneously jumps to an infinite value for $\arcsin$ function. For lower reflectivity values of $R_1 R_2$, the FWHM linewidth of the Airy peaks is undefined. The limiting case occurs at

$$\Delta \nu_{\rm Airy} = \Delta \nu_{\rm FSR} \Rightarrow \frac{1 - \sqrt{R_1 R_2}}{2 \sqrt[4]{R_1 R_2}} = 1 \Rightarrow R_1 R_2 \approx 0.02944.$$

For equal mirror reflectivities, this point is reached when $R_1 = R_2 \approx 17.2\%$ (solid red line in the figure "Airy distribution $A_{\rm trans}^{\prime}$").

The finesse of the Airy distribution of a Fabry–Pérot resonator, which is displayed as the green curve in the figure "Lorentzian linewidth and finesse versus Airy linewidth and finesse of a Fabry–Pérot resonator" in direct comparison with the Lorentzian finesse $\mathcal{F}_c$, is defined as

$$\mathcal{F}_{\rm Airy} = \frac{\Delta \nu_{\rm FSR}}{\Delta \nu_{\rm Airy}} = \frac{\pi}{2} \left[ \arcsin \left( \frac{1 - \sqrt{R_1 R_2}}{2 \sqrt[4]{R_1 R_2}} \right) \right]^{-1}.$$

When scanning the length of the Fabry–Pérot resonator (or the angle of incident light), the Airy finesse quantifies the maximum number of Airy distributions created by light at individual frequencies $\nu_m$ within the free spectral range of the Fabry–Pérot resonator, whose adjacent peaks can be unambiguously distinguished spectroscopically, i.e., they do not overlap at their FWHM (see figure "The physical meaning of the Airy finesse"). This definition of the Airy finesse is consistent with the Taylor criterion of the resolution of a spectrometer. Since the concept of the FWHM linewidth breaks down at $\Delta \nu_{\rm Airy} = \Delta \nu_{\rm FSR}$, consequently the Airy finesse is defined only until $\mathcal{F}_{\rm Airy} = 1$, see the figure "Lorentzian linewidth and finesse versus Airy linewidth and finesse of a Fabry–Pérot resonator".

Often the unnecessary approximation $\sin{(\phi)} \approx \phi$ is made when deriving from $A_{\rm trans}^{\prime}$ the Airy linewidth $\Delta \nu_{\rm Airy}$. In contrast to the exact solution above, it leads to

$$\Delta \nu_{\rm Airy} \approx \Delta \nu_{\rm FSR} \frac{1}{\pi} \frac{1 - \sqrt {R_1 R_2}}{\sqrt[4]{R_1 R_2}} \Rightarrow \mathcal{F}_{\rm Airy} = \frac{\Delta \nu_{\rm FSR}}{\Delta \nu_{\rm Airy}} \approx \pi \frac{\sqrt[4]{R_1 R_2}}{1 - \sqrt {R_1 R_2}}.$$

This approximation of the Airy linewidth, displayed as the red curve in the figure "Lorentzian linewidth and finesse versus Airy linewidth and finesse of a Fabry–Pérot resonator", deviates from the correct curve at low reflectivities and incorrectly does not break down when $\Delta \nu_{\rm Airy} > \Delta \nu_{\rm FSR}$. This approximation is then typically also used to calculate the Airy finesse.

=== Frequency-dependent mirror reflectivities ===
The more general case of a Fabry–Pérot resonator with frequency-dependent mirror reflectivities can be treated with the same equations as above, except that the photon decay time $\tau_c(\nu)$ and linewidth $\Delta \nu_c(\nu)$ now become local functions of frequency. Whereas the photon decay time is still a well-defined quantity, the linewidth loses its meaning, because it resembles a spectral bandwidth, whose value now changes within that very bandwidth. Also in this case each Airy distribution is the sum of all underlying mode profiles which can be strongly distorted. An example of the Airy distribution $A_{\rm trans}^{\prime}$ and a few of the underlying mode profiles $\gamma_{q,{\rm trans}}^{\prime}(\nu)$ is given in the figure "Example of a Fabry–Pérot resonator with frequency-dependent mirror reflectivity".

=== Fabry–Pérot resonator with intrinsic optical losses ===
Intrinsic propagation losses inside the resonator can be quantified by an intensity-loss coefficient $\alpha_{\rm loss}$ per unit length or, equivalently, by the intrinsic round-trip loss $L_{\rm RT},$ such that

$$1 - L_{\rm RT} = e^{-\alpha_{\rm loss} 2 \ell } = e^{- t_{\rm RT} / \tau_{\rm loss}}.$$

The additional loss shortens the photon-decay time $\tau_c$ of the resonator:

$$\frac{1}{\tau_c} = \frac{1}{\tau_{\rm out}} + \frac{1}{\tau_{\rm loss}} = \frac{-\ln{[R_1 R_2 (1 - L_{\rm RT})]}}{t_{\rm RT}} = \frac{-\ln{[R_1 R_2]}}{t_{\rm RT}} + c \alpha_{\rm loss}.$$

where $c$ is the light speed in cavity. The generic Airy distribution or internal resonance enhancement factor $A_{\rm circ}$ is then derived as above by including the propagation losses via the amplitude-loss coefficient $\alpha_{\rm loss} / 2$:

$$E_{\rm circ} = E_{\rm laun} + E_{\rm RT} = E_{\rm laun} + r_1 r_2 e^{-(\alpha_{\rm loss} / 2) 2 \ell} e^{-i 2 \phi} E_{\rm circ} \Rightarrow \frac{E_{\rm circ}}{E_{\rm laun}} = \frac{1}{1 - r_1 r_2 e^{-\alpha_{\rm loss} \ell} e^{-i 2 \phi}} \Rightarrow$$
$$A_{\rm circ} = \frac{I_{\rm circ}}{I_{\rm laun}} = \frac{\left| E_{\rm circ} \right|^2}{\left| E_{\rm laun} \right|^2} = \frac{1}{\left| 1 - r_1 r_2 e^{-\alpha_{\rm loss} \ell} e^{-i 2 \phi} \right|^2} = \frac{1}{\left( {1 - \sqrt{R_1 R_2} e^{-\alpha_{\rm loss} \ell}} \right)^2 + 4 \sqrt{R_1 R_2} e^{-\alpha_{\rm loss} \ell} \sin^2(\phi)}.$$

The other Airy distributions can then be derived as above by additionally taking into account the propagation losses. Particularly, the transfer function with loss becomes

$$A_\text{trans}^{\prime} = \frac{I_{\rm trans}}{I_{\rm inc}} = (1 - R_1) (1 - R_2) e^{-\alpha_{\rm loss} \ell} A_{\rm circ} = \frac{(1 - R_1) (1 - R_2) e^{-\alpha_{\rm loss} \ell}}{\left( {1 - \sqrt{R_1 R_2} e^{-\alpha_{\rm loss} \ell}} \right)^2 + 4 \sqrt{R_1 R_2} e^{-\alpha_{\rm loss} \ell} \sin^2(\phi)}.$$

=== Description of the Fabry–Pérot resonator in wavelength space ===
A Fabry–Pérot etalon. Light enters the etalon and undergoes multiple internal reflections.

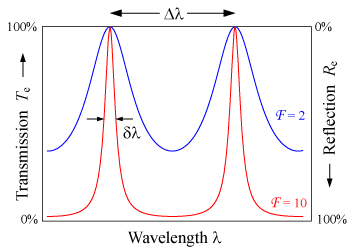
The transmission of an etalon as a function of wavelength. A high-finesse etalon (red line) shows sharper peaks and lower transmission minima than a low-finesse etalon (blue).

Finesse as a function of reflectivity. Very high finesse factors require highly reflective mirrors.

Transient analysis of a silicon (n = 3.4) Fabry–Pérot etalon at normal incidence. The upper animation is for etalon thickness chosen to give maximum transmission while the lower animation is for thickness chosen to give minimum transmission.

False color transient for a high refractive index, dielectric slab in air. The thickness/frequencies have been selected such that red (top) and blue (bottom) experience maximum transmission, whereas the green (middle) experiences minimum transmission.

The varying transmission function of an etalon is caused by interference between the multiple reflections of light between the two reflecting surfaces. Constructive interference occurs if the transmitted beams are in phase, and this corresponds to a high-transmission peak of the etalon. If the transmitted beams are out-of-phase, destructive interference occurs and this corresponds to a transmission minimum. Whether the multiply reflected beams are in phase or not depends on the wavelength (λ) of the light (in vacuum), the angle the light travels through the etalon (θ), the thickness of the etalon (ℓ) and the refractive index of the material between the reflecting surfaces (n).

The phase difference between each successive transmitted pair (i.e. T_{2} and T_{1} in the diagram) is given by

$$\delta = \left( \frac{2 \pi}{\lambda} \right) 2n\ell \cos\theta.$$

If both surfaces have a reflectance R, the transmittance function of the etalon is given by

$$T_e = \frac{(1 - R)^2}{1 - 2R\cos\delta + R^2} = \frac{1}{1 + F\sin^2\left(\frac{\delta}{2}\right)},$$

where

$$F = \frac{4R}{(1 - R)^2}$$

is the coefficient of finesse.

Maximum transmission ($T_e = 1$) occurs when the optical path length difference ($2 n l \cos\theta$) between each transmitted beam is an integer multiple of the wavelength. In the absence of absorption, the reflectance of the etalon R_{e} is the complement of the transmittance, such that $T_e + R_e = 1$. The maximum reflectivity is given by

$$R_\max = 1 - \frac{1}{1 + F} = \frac{4R}{(1 + R)^2},$$

and this occurs when the path-length difference is equal to half an odd multiple of the wavelength.

The wavelength separation between adjacent transmission peaks is called the free spectral range (FSR) of the etalon, Δλ, and is given by:

$$\Delta\lambda = \frac{\lambda_0^2}{2n_\mathrm{g} \ell \cos\theta + \lambda_0 } \approx \frac{\lambda_0^2}{2n_\mathrm{g} \ell \cos\theta},$$

where λ_{0} is the central wavelength of the nearest transmission peak and $n_\mathrm{g}$ is the group refractive index. The FSR is related to the full-width half-maximum, δλ, of any one transmission band by a quantity known as the finesse:

$$\mathcal{F} = \frac{\Delta\lambda}{\delta\lambda} = \frac{\pi}{2 \arcsin\left(\frac{1}{\sqrt F}\right)}.$$

This is commonly approximated (for R > 0.5) by

$$\mathcal{F} \approx \frac{\pi \sqrt{F}}{2} = \frac{\pi R^\frac{1}{2}}{1 - R}.$$

If the two mirrors are not equal, the finesse becomes

$$\mathcal{F} \approx \frac{\pi \left(R_1 R_2\right)^\frac{1}{4} }{1 - \left(R_1 R_2\right)^\frac{1}{2}}.$$

Etalons with high finesse show sharper transmission peaks with lower minimum transmission coefficients. In the oblique incidence case, the finesse will depend on the polarization state of the beam, since the value of R, given by the Fresnel equations, is generally different for p and s polarizations.

Two beams are shown in the diagram at the right, one of which (T_{0}) is transmitted through the etalon, and the other of which (T_{1}) is reflected twice before being transmitted. At each reflection, the amplitude is reduced by $\sqrt{R}$, while at each transmission through an interface the amplitude is reduced by $\sqrt{T}$. Assuming no absorption, conservation of energy requires T + R = 1. In the derivation below, n is the index of refraction inside the etalon, and n_{0} is that outside the etalon. It is presumed that n > n_{0}. The incident amplitude at point a is taken to be one, and phasors are used to represent the amplitude of the radiation. The transmitted amplitude at point b will then be

$$t_0 = T\,e^{ik\ell/\cos\theta},$$

where $k = 2\pi n/\lambda$ is the wavenumber inside the etalon, and λ is the vacuum wavelength. At point c the transmitted amplitude will be

$$t'_1 = TR\,e^{3ik\ell/\cos\theta}.$$

The total amplitude of both beams will be the sum of the amplitudes of the two beams measured along a line perpendicular to the direction of the beam. The amplitude t_{0} at point b can therefore be added to t'_{1} retarded in phase by an amount $k_0 \ell_0$, where $k_0 = 2\pi n_0/\lambda$ is the wavenumber outside of the etalon. Thus

$$t_1 = TR\,e^{\left(3ik\ell/\cos\theta\right) - ik_0 \ell_0},$$

where ℓ_{0} is

$$\ell_0 = 2\ell\tan\theta\sin\theta_0.$$

The phase difference between the two beams is

$$\delta = {2k\ell\over\cos\theta} - k_0 \ell_0.$$

The relationship between θ and θ_{0} is given by Snell's law:

$$n \sin\theta = n_0 \sin\theta_0,$$

so that the phase difference may be written as

$$\delta = 2k\ell\,\cos\theta.$$

To within a constant multiplicative phase factor, the amplitude of the mth transmitted beam can be written as

$$t_m = TR^m e^{im\delta}.$$

The total transmitted amplitude is the sum of all individual beams' amplitudes:

$$t = \sum_{m=0}^\infty t_m = T \sum_{m=0}^\infty R^m\,e^{im\delta}.$$

The series is a geometric series, whose sum can be expressed analytically. The amplitude can be rewritten as

$$t = \frac{T}{1 - Re^{i\delta}}.$$

The intensity of the beam will be just t times its complex conjugate. Since the incident beam was assumed to have an intensity of one, this will also give the transmission function:

$$T_e = tt^* = \frac{T^2}{1 + R^2 - 2R\cos\delta}.$$

For an asymmetrical cavity, that is, one with two different mirrors, the general form of the transmission function is

$$T_e = \frac{T_1 T_2}{1 + R_1 R_2 - 2 \sqrt{R_1 R_2} \cos\delta}.$$

A Fabry–Pérot interferometer differs from a Fabry–Pérot etalon in the fact that the distance ℓ between the plates can be tuned in order to change the wavelengths at which transmission peaks occur in the interferometer. Due to the angle dependence of the transmission, the peaks can also be shifted by rotating the etalon with respect to the beam.

Another expression for the transmission function was already derived in the description in frequency space as the infinite sum of all longitudinal mode profiles. Defining $\gamma = \ln\left(\frac{1}{R}\right)$ the above expression may be written as

$$T_e = \frac{T^2}{1 - R^2}\left(\frac{\sinh\gamma}{\cosh\gamma - \cos\delta}\right).$$

The second term is proportional to a wrapped Lorentzian distribution so that the transmission function may be written as a series of Lorentzian functions:

$$T_e = \frac{2\pi\,T^2}{1 - R^2}\,\sum_{\ell=-\infty}^\infty L(\delta - 2\pi\ell; \gamma),$$

where

$$L(x; \gamma) = \frac{\gamma}{\pi\left(x^2 + \gamma^2\right)}.$$

== See also ==
- Lummer–Gehrcke interferometer
- Gires–Tournois etalon
- Atomic line filter
- ARROW waveguide
- Distributed Bragg reflector
- Fiber Bragg grating
- Optical microcavity
- Thin-film interference
- Laser linewidth
