= Photodetection =

Quantum process

In his historic paper entitled "The Quantum Theory of Optical Coherence," Roy J. Glauber set a solid foundation for the quantum electronics/quantum optics enterprise. The experimental development of the optical maser and later laser at that time had made the classical concept of optical coherence inadequate. Glauber started from the quantum theory of light detection by considering the process of photoionization in which a photodetector is triggered by an ionizing absorption of a photon. In the quantum theory of radiation, the electric field operator in the Coulomb gauge may be written as the sum of positive and negative frequency parts

$$E (\mathbf{r}, t) = E^{(+)}(\mathbf{r}, t) + E^{(-)}(\mathbf{r}, t)$$

where

$$E^{(-)}(\mathbf{r}, t) = E^{(+)}(\mathbf{r}, t)^\dagger$$

One may expand $E^{(+)}(\mathbf{r}, t)$ in terms of the normal modes as follows:

$$E^{(+)}(\mathbf {r}, t) = i\sum_{j}\left(\frac{\hbar\omega_{j}}{2}\right)^{1/2}\hat{a}_{j}\mathbf{\varepsilon}_{j}e^{i(\mathbf {k}_{j}\cdot\mathbf {r} - \omega_{j}t)}$$

where $\mathbf {\varepsilon}_{j}$ are the unit vectors of polarization; this expansion has the same form as the classical expansion except that now the field amplitudes $\hat{a}_{j}$ are operators.

Glauber showed that, for an ideal photodetector situated at a point $\mathbf {r}$ in a radiation field, the probability of observing a photoionization event in this detector between time ${t}$ and ${\it t} + d{\it t}$ is proportional to $W_{I}(\mathbf {r}, t)d{\it t}$, where

$${W_{I}(\mathbf {r}, t)} =\langle \psi \mid {E^{(-)}(\mathbf {r}, t)} \cdot
{E^{(+)}(\mathbf
{r}, t)}\mid \psi \rangle$$

and $|\psi\rangle$ specifies the state of the field. Since the radiation field is a quantum-mechanical one, we do not know the exact properties of the incident light, and the probability should be averaged, as in the classical theory, to be proportional to

$$\langle \hat{a}_{j}^\dagger\hat{a}_{j} \rangle$$

where the angular brackets mean an average over the light field. The significance of the quantum theory of coherence is in the ordering of the creation and destruction operators $\hat{a}_{j}^\dagger$ and $\hat{a}_{j}$:

$$[\hat{a}_{j}, \hat{a}_{j}^\dagger] = 1$$

Since $\hat{a}_{j}^\dagger\hat{a}_{j}$ is not equal to $\hat{a}_{j}\hat{a}_{j}^\dagger$ for a light field, the order makes the quantum statistical measurements (such as photon counting) quite different from the classical ones, i.e., the nonclassical properties of light, such as photon antibunching.

Moreover, Glauber's theory of photodetection is of far-reaching fundamental significance to interpretation of quantum mechanics. The Glauber detection theory differs from the Born probabilistic interpretation, in that it expresses the meaning of physical law in terms of measured facts (relationships), counting events in the detection processes, without assuming the particle model of matter. These concepts quite naturally lead to a relational approach to quantum physics.
