= M squared =

Measure of laser beam quality

In laser science, the parameter M^{2}, also known as the beam propagation ratio or beam quality factor, is a measure of laser beam quality. It represents the degree of variation of a beam from an ideal Gaussian beam. It is calculated from the ratio of the beam parameter product (BPP) of the beam to that of a Gaussian beam with the same wavelength. It relates the beam divergence of a laser beam to the minimum focussed spot size that can be achieved. For a single mode TEM_{00} (Gaussian) laser beam, M^{2} is exactly one. Unlike the beam parameter product, M^{2} is unitless and does not vary with wavelength.

The M^{2} value for a laser beam is widely used in the laser industry as a specification, and its method of measurement is regulated as an ISO standard.

== Measurement ==
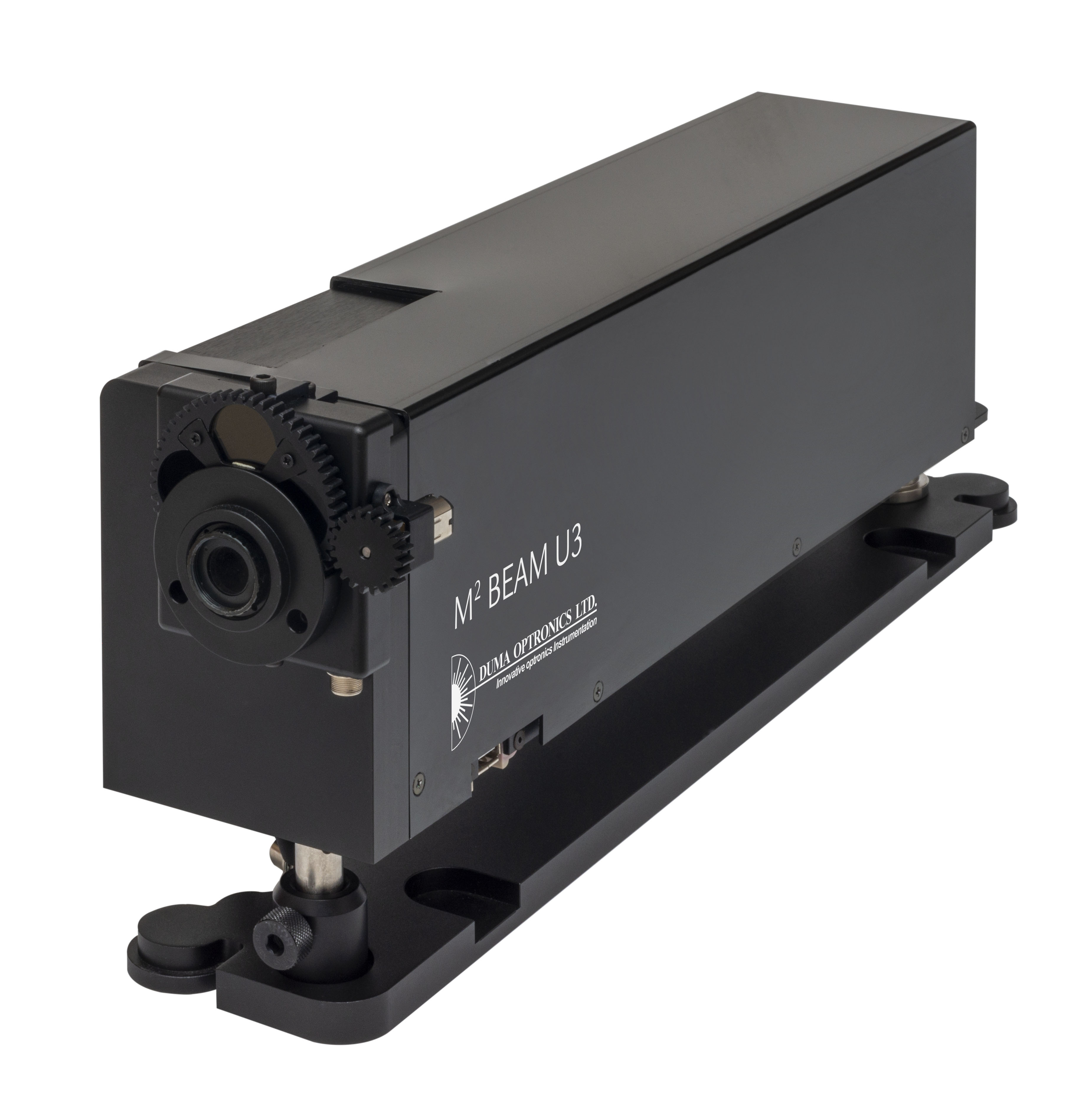
A commercial M^{2} measurement instrument

There are several ways to define the width of a beam. When measuring the beam parameter product and M^{2}, one uses the D4σ or "second moment" width of the beam to determine both the radius of the beam's waist and the divergence in the far field.

M^{2} can be measured by placing an array detector or scanning-slit profiler at multiple positions within the beam after focusing it with a lens of high optical quality and known focal length. To properly obtain M^{2}, the following steps must be followed:

1. Measure the D4σ widths at 5 axial positions near the beam waist (the location where the beam is narrowest).
2. Measure the D4σ widths at 5 axial positions at least one Rayleigh length away from the waist.
3. Fit the 10 measured data points to
  $$W^2(z) = W_0^2 + M^4 \left(\frac{\lambda}{\pi W_0}\right)^2 (z - z_0)^2,$$
  where $W(z)$ is half of the $\text{D4}\sigma(z)$ beam width, and $z$ is distance in the direction of beam propagation, with $z_0$ the location of the beam waist with width $W_0$. Fitting the 10 data points yields M^{2}, $z_0$, and $W_0$. Siegman showed that all beam profiles — Gaussian, flat-top, TEMxy, or any shape — must follow the equation above provided that the beam radius uses the D4σ definition of the beam width.

Using other definitions of beam width gives results that may be inaccurate for some beam profiles. In practice, one could use a single measurement at the waist to obtain the waist diameter, a single measurement in the far field to obtain the divergence, and then use these to calculate the M^{2}. The procedure above gives a more accurate result, however.

== Utility ==
M^{2} is useful because it reflects how well a collimated laser beam can be focused to a small spot, or how well a divergent laser source can be collimated. It is a better guide to beam quality than Gaussian appearance because there are cases in which a beam can look Gaussian, yet have an M^{2} value far from unity. Likewise, a beam intensity profile can appear very "un-Gaussian", yet have an M^{2} value close to unity.

The quality of a beam is important for many applications. In fiber-optic communications beams with an M^{2} close to 1 are required for coupling to single-mode optical fiber.

M^{2} determines how tightly a collimated beam of a given diameter can be focused: the diameter of the focal spot varies as M^{2}, and the irradiance scales as 1/M^{4}. For a given laser cavity, the output beam diameter (collimated or focused) scales as M, and the irradiance as 1/M^{2}. This is very important in laser machining and laser welding, which depend on high fluence at the weld location.

Generally, M^{2} increases as a laser's output power increases. It is difficult to obtain excellent beam quality and high average power at the same time due to thermal lensing in the laser gain medium.

== Embedded Gaussian ==
Real laser beams are often non-Gaussian, being multi-mode or mixed-mode. Multi-mode beam propagation can be modeled by considering an imaginary "embedded" Gaussian, whose beam waist is M times smaller than that of the multimode beam. The diameter of the multimode beam is then M times that of the embedded Gaussian beam everywhere, and the divergence is M times greater, but the wavefront curvature is the same. The multimode beam has M^{2} times the beam area but 1/M^{2} less beam intensity than the embedded beam. This holds true for any given optical system, and thus the minimum (focussed) spot size or beam waist of a multi-mode laser beam is M times that of the embedded Gaussian beam waist.

== See also ==
- Laser beam profiler
- Strehl ratio
