= Half power =

Half power may refer to:

- Half-power point (disambiguation), at which output power has dropped to half peak value, in filters, optical filters, electronic amplifiers, and antennas
  - Half power frequency
  - Half power beam width
- Square root, written in exponent notation as x^{1/2}

== See also ==
- Full width at half maximum, in a distribution
