= Quasioptics =

Subfield of optics

Quasioptics concerns the propagation of electromagnetic radiation where the wavelength is comparable to the size of the optical components (e.g. lenses, mirrors, and apertures) and hence diffraction effects may become significant. It commonly describes the propagation of Gaussian beams where the beam width is comparable to the wavelength. This is in contrast to geometrical optics, where the wavelength is small compared to the relevant length scales. Quasioptics is so named because it represents an intermediate regime between conventional optics and electronics, and is often relevant to the description of signals in the far-infrared or terahertz region of the electromagnetic spectrum. It represents a simplified version of the more rigorous treatment of physical optics.

== See also ==
- Optoelectronics
