= Edward Lindsay Ince =

Prof Edward Lindsay Ince FRSE (30 November 1891 – 16 March 1941) was a British mathematician who worked on differential equations, especially those with periodic coefficients such as the Mathieu equation and the Lamé equation. He introduced the Ince equation, a generalization of the Mathieu equation.

== Life ==
He was born in Amblecote in Worcestershire on 30 November 1891, the only son of Caroline Clara Cutler and her husband Edward Ince, an Inland Revenue officer. The family moved to Criccieth near Portmadoc in Wales soon after he was born. His family moved to Perth in Scotland around 1901, living at 6 Queens Avenue in the Craigie district, to the south-west of the city. He attended Perth Academy.

He studied mathematics at the University of Edinburgh from 1909, graduating in 1913. Failing the medical for World War I service, he won a scholarship and went to the University of Cambridge where he graduated with an MA, and won the Smith's Prize in 1918. That same year he obtained a DSc from the University of Edinburgh. He then began lecturing in mathematics at the University of Leeds In 1920 he moved to the University of Liverpool.

He was elected to the Royal Society of Edinburgh in 1923. His proposers were Sir Edmund Taylor Whittaker, David Gibb, Arthur Crichton Mitchell and Ralph Allan Sampson. The Society awarded him the Makdougall Brisbane Prize for 1938–1940 for his work on periodic Lamé functions (Ince 1940a, 1940b) but he died before he received the award.

In 1926 he made a dramatic move, and accepted a professorship at the Egyptian University in Cairo. With a young family, and health problems arising from the extreme heat, he returned to Britain in 1931 to take a post at the University of Edinburgh for one year then spent two years at Imperial College, London before returning to Edinburgh permanently in 1935.

He died in Edinburgh on 16 March 1941.

== Family ==
In 1923 he married Phyllis Fry. They had two daughters, Monica and Elizabeth. Monica Hughes(OC) went on to become a renowned author of children's and young adult books.

== Publications ==
- Ince, E. L. (1915), A course in descriptive geometry and photogrammetry for the mathematical laboratory, Edinburgh mathematical tracts, G. Bell & Sons, Limited
- Ince, E. L. (1933), Principles of descriptive geometry, E. Arnold
- Ince, Edward L. (1939), Integration of Ordinary Differential Equations, Oliver and Boyd, Edinburgh, MR 0000325
- Ince, Edward L. (1940a), "The periodic Lamé functions", Proc. R. Soc. Edinburgh, 60: 47–63, doi:10.1017/S0370164600020058, MR 0002399
- Ince, Edward L. (1940b), "Further investigations into the periodic Lamé functions", Proc. R. Soc. Edinburgh, 60: 83–99, doi:10.1017/S0370164600020071, MR 0002400
- Ince, Edward L. (1944) [1926], Ordinary Differential Equations, Dover Publications, New York, ISBN 978-0-486-60349-0, MR 0010757
