= Laser beam machining =

Use of laser beams to remove material from a workpiece

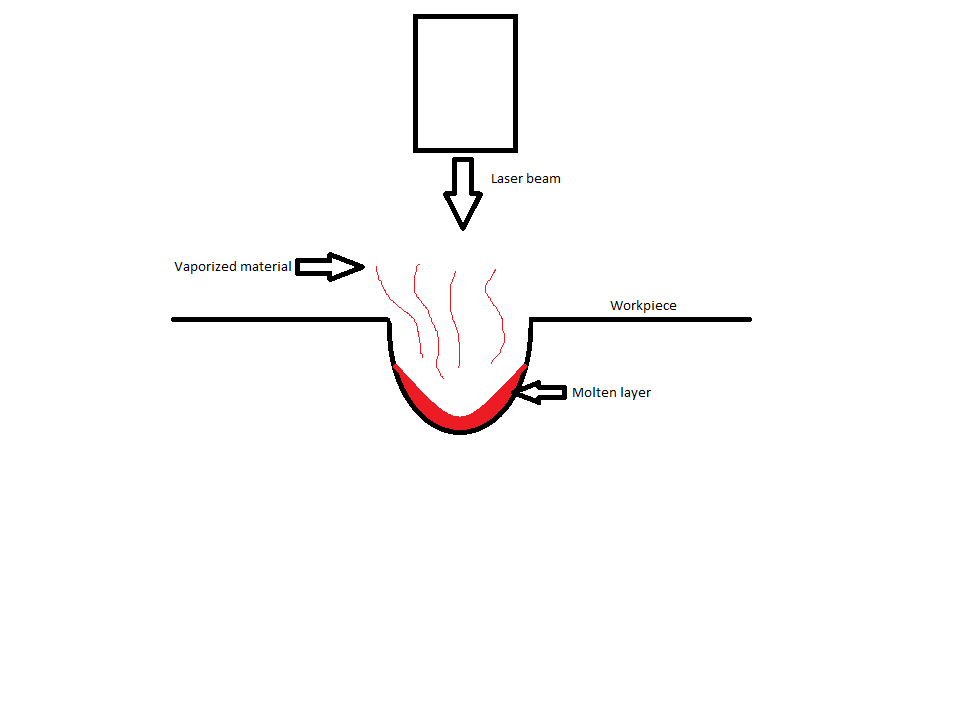
A visual of laser beam machining

Laser beam machining (LBM) is a form of machining that uses heat directed from a laser beam. This process uses thermal energy to remove material from metallic or nonmetallic surfaces. The high frequency of monochromatic light will fall on the surface, thus heating, melting and vaporizing the material due to the impinge of photons (see Coulomb explosion). Laser beam machining is best suited for brittle materials with low conductivity, but can be used on most materials.

Laser beam machining can be done on glass without melting the surface. With photosensitive glass, the laser alters the chemical structure of the glass allowing it to be selectively etched. The glass is also referred to as photomachinable glass. The advantage of photomachinable glass is that it can produce precisely vertical walls and the native glass is suitable for many biological applications such as substrates for genetic analysis.

== Types of lasers ==
There are many different types of lasers including gas, solid states lasers, and excimer.

Some of the most commonly used gases consist of; He-Ne, Ar, and Carbon dioxide laser.

Solid-state lasers are designed by doping a rare element into various host materials. Unlike in gas lasers, solid state lasers are pumped optically by flash lamps or arc lamps. Ruby is one of the frequently used host materials in this type of laser. A ruby laser is a type of the solid state laser whose laser medium is a synthetic ruby crystal. The synthetic ruby rod is optically pumped using a xenon flashtube before it is used as an active laser medium.

YAG is an abbreviation for yttrium aluminum garnet which are crystals that are used for solid-state lasers while Nd:YAG refers to neodymium-doped yttrium aluminum garnet crystals that are used in the solid-state lasers as the laser mediate.

YAG lasers emit a wavelength of light waves with high energy. Nd:glass is neodymium–doped gain media made of either silicate or phosphate materials that are used in fiber laser.

== Cutting depth ==
The cutting depth of a laser is directly proportional to the quotient obtained by dividing the power of the laser beam by the product of the cutting velocity and the diameter of the laser beam spot.

$$t \propto  \frac{P}{vd} ,$$

where t is the depth of cut, P is the laser beam power, v is the cutting velocity, and d is the laser beam spot diameter.

The depth of the cut is also influenced by the workpiece material. The material's reflectivity, density, specific heat, and melting point temperature all contribute to the lasers ability to cut the workpiece.

The following table shows the ability of different lasers to cut different materials:

material	wavelength (micrometer) CO2 laser: 10.6	wavelength (micrometer) Nd:YAG laser: 1.06
ceramics	well	poorly
plywood	very well	fairly well
polycarbonate	well	fairly well
polyethylene	very well	fairly well
Perspex	very well	fairly well
Titanium	well	well
Gold	not possible	well
Copper	poorly	well
Aluminium	well	well
stainless steel		very well
construction steel		very well

== Applications ==
Lasers can be used for welding, cladding, marking, surface treatment, drilling, and cutting among other manufacturing processes. It is used in the automobile, shipbuilding, aerospace, steel, electronics, and medical industries for precision machining of complex parts.

Laser welding is advantageous in that it can weld at speeds of up to 100 mm/s as well as the ability to weld dissimilar metals. Laser cladding is used to coat cheap or weak parts with a harder material in order to improve the surface quality. Drilling and cutting with lasers is advantageous in that there is little to no wear on the cutting tool as there is no contact to cause damage.

Milling with a laser is a three dimensional process that requires two lasers, but drastically cuts costs of machining parts. Lasers can be used to change the surface properties of a workpiece.

The appliance of laser beam machining varies depending on the industry. In light manufacturing the machine is used to engrave and to drill other metals. In the electronic industry laser beam machining is used for wire stripping and skiving of circuits. In the medical industry it is used for cosmetic surgery and hair removal.

== Advantages ==
1. Since the rays of a laser beam are monochromatic and parallel (i.e. zero etendue) it can be focused to a small diameter and can produce as much as 100 MW of power for a square millimeter of area.
2. Laser beam machining has the ability to engrave or cut nearly all materials, where traditional cutting methods may fall short.
3. There are several types of lasers, and each have different uses.
4. The cost of maintaining lasers is moderately low due to the low rate of wear and tear, as there is no physical contact between the tool and the workpiece.
5. The machining provided by laser beams is high precision, and most of these processes do not require additional finishing.
6. Laser beams can be paired with gases to help the cutting process be more efficient, help minimize oxidization of surfaces, and/or keep the workpiece surface free from melted or vaporized material.

== Disadvantages ==
1. The initial cost of acquiring a laser beam is moderately high. There are many accessories that aid in the machining process, and as most of these accessories are as important as the laser beam itself the startup cost of machining is raised further.
2. Handling and maintaining the machining requires highly trained individuals. Operating the laser beam is comparatively technical, and services from an expert may be required.
3. Laser beams are not designed to produce mass metal processes.
4. Laser beam machining consumes a lot of energy.
5. Deep cuts are difficult with workpieces with high melting points and usually cause a taper.

== See also ==
- Laser cutting
- Laser beam quality
