= Ince equation =

In mathematics, the Ince equation, named for Edward Lindsay Ince, is the differential equation

$$w^{\prime\prime}+\xi\sin(2z)w^{\prime}+(\eta-p\xi\cos(2z))w=0. \,$$

When p is a non-negative integer, it has polynomial solutions called Ince polynomials. In particular, when $p=1, \eta\pm\xi=1$, then it has a closed-form solution

$w(z)=Ce^{-iz}(e^{2iz}\mp 1)$

where $C$ is a constant.

== See also ==
- Whittaker–Hill equation
- Ince–Gaussian beam
