= Beam diameter =

Width of an electromagnetic beam

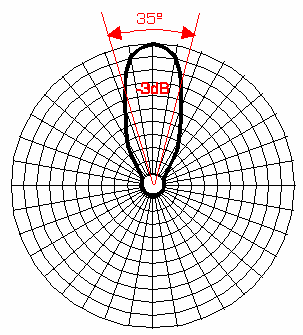
A polar diagram showing beamwidth

The beam diameter or beam width of an electromagnetic beam is the diameter along any specified line that is perpendicular to the beam axis and intersects it. Since beams typically do not have sharp edges, the diameter can be defined in many different ways. Five definitions of the beam width are in common use: D4σ, 10/90 or 20/80 knife-edge, 1/e^{2}, FWHM, and D86. The beam width can be measured in units of length at a particular plane perpendicular to the beam axis, but it can also refer to the angular diameter (i.e., angular width), which is the angle subtended by the beam at the source. The angular width is also called the beam divergence.

Beam diameter is usually used to characterize electromagnetic beams in the optical regime, and occasionally in the microwave regime, that is, cases in which the aperture from which the beam emerges is very large with respect to the wavelength.

Beam diameter usually refers to a beam of circular cross section, but not necessarily so. A beam may, for example, have an elliptical cross section, in which case the orientation of the beam diameter must be specified, for example with respect to the major or minor axis of the elliptical cross section. The term "beam width" may be preferred in applications where the beam does not have circular symmetry.

== Definitions ==
Siegman lists seven different measures of beam width, with some of the practical difficulties of defining beam width. Commonly used definitions include:

=== Rayleigh beamwidth ===
The angle between the maximum peak of radiated power and the first null (no power radiated in this direction) is called the Rayleigh beamwidth. This is well-defined for some beam profiles, for example, the Airy diffraction pattern of a uniformly-lit aperture, but is undefined for an ideal Gaussian beam.

=== Full width at half maximum ===
The half-power beamwidth is the angle off boresight at which the antenna gain first falls to half power (approximately −3 dB) from the peak. The simplest way to define the width of a beam is to choose two diametrically opposite points at which the irradiance is a specified fraction of the beam's peak irradiance, and take the distance between them as a measure of the beam's width. An obvious choice for this fraction is 1/2 (−3 dB), in which case the diameter obtained is the full width at half maximum (FWHM).

Beamwidth is usually but not always expressed in degrees and for the horizontal plane. It refers to the main lobe, when referenced to the peak effective radiated power of the main lobe.

In lighting applications, beam angle is often defined as FWHM luminous intensity. The field angle for floodlights is the full width at 10% intensity.

==== For antenna arrays ====
The beamwidth can be computed for arbitrary antenna arrays. Defining the array manifold as the complex response of the $\mathrm{m}$ element antenna array as $\mathrm{A}(\theta)$, where $\mathrm{A}(\theta)$ is a matrix with $\mathrm{m}$ rows, the beam pattern is first computed as:

$$\mathrm{B}(\theta) = \frac{1}{\mathrm{m}}\mathrm{A}(\theta_0)^{*}\mathrm{A}(\theta)$$

where $\mathrm{A}(\theta_0)^{*}$ is the conjugate transpose of $\mathrm{A}$ at the reference angle $\theta_0$.

From the beam pattern $\mathrm{B}(\theta)$, the antenna power is computed as:

$$\mathrm{P} = |\mathrm{B}|^{2}\,.$$

The half-power beamwidth (HPBW) is then found as the value of $\theta$ where $\mathrm{P} = 0.5\mathrm{P_{max}}$.

=== 1/e^{2} width ===
The 1/e^{2} width is the distance between the two points where the intensity falls to 1/e^{2} = 0.135 times the maximum value. If there are more than two points that are 1/e^{2} times the maximum value, then the two points closest to the maximum are chosen. The 1/e^{2} width is important in the mathematics of Gaussian beams, in which the intensity profile is described by
$$I(r) = I_{0} \left( \frac{w_0}{w} \right)^2 \exp \! \left(  \! -2 \frac{r^2}{w^2}\right ).$$

The American National Standard Z136.1-2007 for Safe Use of Lasers (p. 6) defines the beam diameter as the distance between diametrically opposed points in that cross-section of a beam where the power per unit area is 1/e (0.368) times that of the peak power per unit area. This is the beam diameter definition that is used for computing the maximum permissible exposure to a laser beam. The Federal Aviation Administration also uses the 1/e definition for laser safety calculations in FAA Order JO 7400.2, Para. 29-1-5d.

Measurements of the 1/e^{2} width only depend on three points on the marginal distribution, unlike D4σ and knife-edge widths that depend on the integral of the marginal distribution. 1/e^{2} width measurements are noisier than D4σ width measurements. For multimodal marginal distributions (a beam profile with multiple peaks), the 1/e^{2} width usually does not yield a meaningful value and can grossly underestimate the inherent width of the beam. For multimodal distributions, the D4σ width is a better choice. For an ideal single-mode Gaussian beam, the D4σ, D86 and 1/e^{2} width measurements would give the same value.

For a Gaussian beam, the relationship between the 1/e^{2} width and the full width at half maximum is
$$2w = \frac{\sqrt 2\ \mathrm{FWHM}}{\sqrt{\ln 2}} \simeq 1.699 \times \mathrm{FWHM},$$
where $2w$ is the full width of the beam at 1/e^{2}.

Looking at the intensity profile of a Gaussian beam, the 1/e^{2} width can also be related to its standard deviation: $w = 2 \sigma$.

=== D4σ or second-moment width ===
The D4σ width of a beam in the horizontal or vertical direction is 4 times σ, where σ is the standard deviation of the horizontal or vertical marginal distribution respectively. Mathematically, the D4σ beam width in the x dimension for the beam profile $I(x,y)$ is expressed as

$$D4\sigma = 4 \sigma = 4 \sqrt{\frac{\int_{-\infty}^\infty \int_{-\infty}^\infty I(x,y) (x - \bar{x})^2 \,dx \,dy} {\int_{-\infty}^\infty \int_{-\infty}^\infty I(x,y)\, dx \,dy}},$$

where

$$\bar{x} = \frac{\int_{-\infty}^\infty \int_{-\infty}^\infty I(x,y) x \,dx \,dy}{\int_{-\infty}^\infty \int_{-\infty}^\infty I(x,y) \,dx \,dy}$$

is the centroid of the beam profile in the x direction.

When a beam is measured with a laser beam profiler, the wings of the beam profile influence the D4σ value more than the center of the profile, since the wings are weighted by the square of its distance, x^{2}, from the center of the beam. If the beam does not fill more than a third of the beam profiler's sensor area, then there will be a significant number of pixels at the edges of the sensor that register a small baseline value (the background value). If the baseline value is large or if it is not subtracted out of the image, then the computed D4σ value will be larger than the actual value because the baseline value near the edges of the sensor are weighted in the D4σ integral by x^{2}. Therefore, baseline subtraction is necessary for accurate D4σ measurements. The baseline is easily measured by recording the average value for each pixel when the sensor is not illuminated. The D4σ width, unlike the FWHM and 1/e^{2} widths, is meaningful for multimodal marginal distributions — that is, beam profiles with multiple peaks — but requires careful subtraction of the baseline for accurate results. The D4σ is the ISO international standard definition for beam width.

=== Knife-edge width ===
Before the advent of the CCD beam profiler, the beam width was estimated using the knife-edge technique: slice a laser beam with a razor and measure the power of the clipped beam as a function of the razor position. The measured curve is the integral of the marginal distribution, and starts at the total beam power and decreases monotonically to zero power. The width of the beam is defined as the distance between the points of the measured curve that are 10% and 90% (or 20% and 80%) of the maximum value. If the baseline value is small or subtracted out, the knife-edge beam width always corresponds to 60%, in the case of 20/80, or 80%, in the case of 10/90, of the total beam power no matter what the beam profile. On the other hand, the D4σ, 1/e^{2}, and FWHM widths encompass fractions of power that are beam-shape dependent. Therefore, the 10/90 or 20/80 knife-edge width is a useful metric when the user wishes to be sure that the width encompasses a fixed fraction of total beam power. Most CCD beam profiler's software can compute the knife-edge width numerically.

=== Fusing knife-edge method with imaging ===
The main drawback of the knife-edge technique is that the measured value is displayed only on the scanning direction, minimizing the amount of relevant beam information. To overcome this drawback, an innovative technology offered commercially allows multiple directions beam scanning to create an image like beam representation.

By mechanically moving the knife edge across the beam, the amount of energy impinging the detector area is determined by the obstruction. The profile is then measured from the knife-edge velocity and its relation to the detector's energy reading. Unlike other systems, a unique scanning technique uses several different oriented knife-edges to sweep across the beam. By using tomographic reconstruction, mathematical processes reconstruct the laser beam size in different orientations to an image similar to the one produced by CCD cameras. The main advantage of this scanning method is that it is free from pixel size limitations (as in CCD cameras) and allows beam reconstructions with wavelengths not usable with existing CCD technology. Reconstruction is possible for beams in deep UV to far IR.

=== D86 width ===
The D86 width is defined as the diameter of the circle that is centered at the centroid of the beam profile and contains 86% of the beam power. The solution for D86 is found by computing the area of increasingly larger circles around the centroid until the area contains 0.86 of the total power. Unlike the previous beam width definitions, the D86 width is not derived from marginal distributions. The percentage of 86, rather than 50, 80, or 90, is chosen because a circular Gaussian beam profile integrated down to 1/e^{2} of its peak value contains 86% of its total power. The D86 width is often used in applications that are concerned with knowing exactly how much power is in a given area. For example, applications of high-energy laser weapons and lidars require precise knowledge of how much transmitted power actually illuminates the target.

==== ISO11146 beam width for elliptic beams ====
The definition given before holds for stigmatic (circular symmetric) beams only. For astigmatic beams, however, a more rigorous definition of the beam width has to be used:

$$d_{\sigma x} = 2 \sqrt{2} \left( \langle x^2 \rangle + \langle y^2 \rangle + \gamma \left( \left( \langle x^2 \rangle - \langle y^2 \rangle \right)^2 + 4 \langle xy \rangle^2 \right)^{1/2} \right)^{1/2}$$

and

$$d_{\sigma y} = 2 \sqrt{2} \left( \langle x^2 \rangle + \langle y^2 \rangle - \gamma \left( \left( \langle x^2 \rangle - \langle y^2 \rangle \right)^2 + 4 \langle xy \rangle^2 \right)^{1/2} \right)^{1/2}.$$

This definition also incorporates information about x–y correlation $\langle xy \rangle$, but for circular symmetric beams, both definitions are the same.

Some new symbols appeared within the formulas, which are the first- and second-order moments:

$$\langle x \rangle = \frac{1}{P} \int I(x,y) x \,dx \,dy,$$
$$\langle y \rangle = \frac{1}{P} \int I(x,y) y \,dx \,dy,$$
$$\langle x^2 \rangle = \frac{1}{P} \int I(x,y) (x - \langle x \rangle )^2 \,dx \,dy,$$
$$\langle xy \rangle = \frac{1}{P} \int I(x,y) (x - \langle x \rangle ) (y - \langle y \rangle ) \,dx \,dy,$$
$$\langle y^2 \rangle = \frac{1}{P} \int I(x,y) (y - \langle y \rangle )^2 \,dx \,dy,$$

the beam power

$$P = \int I(x,y) \,dx \,dy,$$

and

$$\gamma = \sgn \left( \langle x^2 \rangle - \langle y^2 \rangle \right) = \frac{\langle x^2 \rangle - \langle y^2 \rangle}{|\langle x^2 \rangle - \langle y^2 \rangle|}.$$

Using this general definition, also the beam azimuthal angle $\phi$ can be expressed. It is the angle between the beam directions of minimal and maximal elongations, known as principal axes, and the laboratory system, being the $x$ and $y$ axes of the detector and given by

$$\phi = \frac{1}{2} \arctan \frac{2 \langle xy \rangle}{\langle x^2 \rangle - \langle y^2 \rangle }.$$

== Measurement ==
International standard ISO 11146-1:2005 specifies methods for measuring beam widths (diameters), divergence angles and beam propagation ratios of laser beams (if the beam is stigmatic) and for general astigmatic beams ISO 11146-2 is applicable. The D4σ beam width is the ISO standard definition and the measurement of the M^{2} beam quality parameter requires the measurement of the D4σ widths.

The other definitions provide complementary information to the D4σ. The D4σ and knife-edge widths are sensitive to the baseline value, whereas the 1/e^{2} and FWHM widths are not. The fraction of total beam power encompassed by the beam width depends on which definition is used.

The width of laser beams can be measured by capturing an image on a camera, or by using a laser beam profiler.

== See also ==
- Beam waist
- Fresnel zone
