= Tophat beam =

In optics, a tophat beam (also flat-top or top-hat beam) such as a laser beam or electron beam has a near-uniform fluence (energy density) within a circular disk. It is typically formed by refractive or diffractive optical elements from a Gaussian beam. Tophat beams are often used in industry, for example for laser drilling of holes in printed circuit boards. They are also used in very high power laser systems, which use chains of optical amplifiers to produce an intense beam. Tophat beams are named for their resemblance to the shape of a top hat.

Due to diffraction, a beam cannot maintain a sharp-edged tophat cross-section for more than a short distance of propagation, and the edges of the distribution will become increasingly fuzzy, as the beam propagates forward.

== See also ==
- Bessel beam
- Laser beam profiler
