= Full width at half maximum =

Concept in statistics and wave theory

Full width at half maximum

In a distribution, full width at half maximum (FWHM) is the difference between the two values of the independent variable at which the dependent variable is equal to half of its maximum value. In other words, it is the width of a spectrum curve measured between those points on the y-axis which are half the maximum amplitude. Half width at half maximum (HWHM) is half of the FWHM if the function is symmetric. The term full duration at half maximum (FDHM) is preferred when the independent variable is time.

FWHM is applied to such phenomena as the duration of pulse waveforms (where it is typically called "pulse width at 50%", or PW50) and the spectral width of sources used for optical communications and the resolution of spectrometers. The convention of "width" meaning "half maximum" is also widely used in signal processing to define bandwidth as "width of frequency range where less than half the signal's power is attenuated", i.e., the power is at least half the maximum. In signal processing terms, this is at most 3 dB of attenuation, called half-power point or, more specifically, half-power bandwidth. When half-power point is applied to antenna beam width, it is called half-power beam width.

The term half bandwidth is sometimes used to characterize spectroradiometers. Half bandwidth has the meaning of HWHM; it should not be conflated with the half-width of a band, which is synonymous with FWHM.

== Specific distributions ==
=== Normal distribution ===
If the considered function is the density of a normal distribution of the form
$$f(x) = \frac{1}{\sigma \sqrt{2 \pi} } \exp \left[ -\frac{(x-x_0)^2}{2 \sigma^2} \right]$$
where σ is the standard deviation and x_{0} is the expected value, then the relationship between FWHM and the standard deviation is
$$\mathrm{FWHM} =   2\sqrt{2 \ln 2 } \; \sigma \approx 2.355 \; \sigma.$$
The FWHM does not depend on the expected value x_{0}; it is invariant under translations. The area within this FWHM is approximately 76% of the total area under the function.

=== Gamma distribution ===
The density of a gamma distribution is given by

$$f(x)=\frac{1}{\Gamma(\alpha) \theta^\alpha} x^{\alpha - 1} e^{-x/\theta}$$

with shape parameter $\alpha$ and scale parameter θ. For $\alpha > 1$, the FWHM is given by

$$\mathrm{FWHM}= (\alpha-1)\theta \left[ W_{0} \left(-\frac{2^{-1/(\alpha-1)}}{e}\right) - W_{-1} \left(-\frac{2^{-1/(\alpha-1)}}{e}\right) \right]$$

where $W_k$ denotes the $k$th branch of the Lambert W function. When $\alpha = 1$, the gamma distribution reduces to an exponential distribution, whose FWHM is

$$\mathrm{FWHM}=\theta \ln{2}$$

When $\alpha < 1$, the gamma distribution is monotonically decreasing and therefore has no finite mode or well-defined full width at half maximum.

=== Other distributions ===
In spectroscopy half the width at half maximum (here γ), HWHM, is in common use. For example, a Lorentzian/Cauchy distribution of height 1/πγ can be defined by
$$f(x) = \frac{1}{\pi\gamma \left[1 + \left(\frac{x - x_0}{\gamma}\right)^2\right]} \quad \text{ and } \quad \mathrm{FWHM} = 2 \gamma.$$

Another important distribution function, related to solitons in optics, is the hyperbolic secant:
$$f(x) = \operatorname{sech} \left( \frac{x}{X} \right).$$
Any translating element was omitted, since it does not affect the FWHM. For this impulse we have:
$$\mathrm{FWHM} = 2 \operatorname{arcsch} \left(\tfrac{1}{2}\right) X = 2 \ln (2 + \sqrt{3}) \; X \approx 2.634 \; X$$
where arcsch is the inverse hyperbolic secant.

== See also ==
- Beam diameter § Full width at half maximum
- Gaussian function
- Cutoff frequency
- Spatial resolution

== Sources ==
- Guarisco, Davide; Li, Zhaohui; Higgins, Bill E.; Saito, Kaz; Wu, Yan; LeFebvre, Andrew (2006). "Drive integration in perpendicular recording (invited)" (PDF). Journal of Applied Physics. 99 (8): 08Q908. doi:10.1063/1.2175821.
- "SFR results: Edge and MTF (Sharpness) plot". Imatest.

This article incorporates public domain material from Federal Standard 1037C. General Services Administration. Archived from the original on 2022-01-22.
