= Thermal blooming =

Distortion of laser beams in media

Thermal blooming or thermal lensing occurs when high-energy laser beams propagate through a medium. It is the result of nonlinear interactions that occur when the medium (e.g. air or glass) is heated by absorbing a fraction of the radiation, causing a "thermal lens" to form, with a dioptric power related to the intensity of the laser, among other factors. The amount of energy absorbed is a function of the laser wavelength. The term "thermal blooming" is typically used when the medium is air, and can describe any type of self-induced "thermal distortion" of laser radiation. The term "thermal lensing" is typically used when describing thermal effects in the laser's gain medium itself.

== See also ==
- Optical Kerr effect
