= Beam divergence =

How much a beam expands as it travels

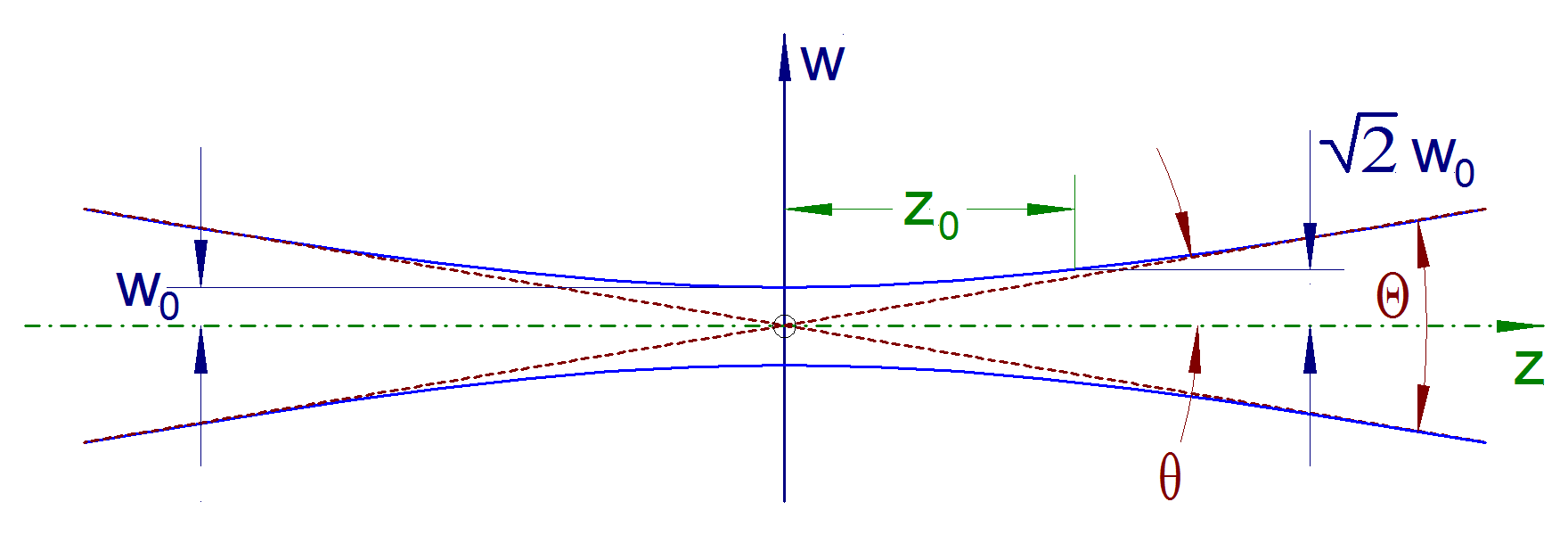
Illustration of parameters of a Gaussian beam: beam waist $w_0$, Rayleigh range $z_0$, beam divergence $\Theta$

In electromagnetics, especially in optics, beam divergence is an angular measure of the increase in beam diameter or radius with distance from the optical aperture or antenna aperture from which the beam emerges. The term is relevant only in the "far field", away from any focus of the beam. Practically speaking, however, the far field can commence physically close to the radiating aperture, depending on aperture diameter and the operating wavelength.

Beam divergence is often used to characterize electromagnetic beams in the optical regime, for cases in which the aperture from which the beam emerges is very large with respect to the wavelength. However, it is also used in the radio frequency (RF) band for cases in which the antenna is very large relative to a wavelength.

Beam divergence usually refers to a beam of circular cross section, but not necessarily so. A beam may, for example, have an elliptical cross section, in which case the orientation of the beam divergence must be specified, for example with respect to the major or minor axis of the elliptical cross section.

The divergence of a beam can be calculated if one knows the beam diameter at two separate points far from any focus (D_{i}, D_{f}), and the distance (l) between these points. The beam divergence, $\Theta$, is given by

$$\Theta=2 \arctan\left(\frac{D_f-D_i}{2l}\right).$$

If a collimated beam is focused with a lens, the diameter $D_m$ of the beam in the rear focal plane of the lens is related to the divergence of the initial beam by

$$\Theta=\frac{D_m}{f},\,$$

where f is the focal length of the lens. Note that this measurement is valid only when the beam size is measured at the rear focal plane of the lens, i.e. where the focus would lie for a truly collimated beam, and not at the actual focus of the beam, which would occur behind the rear focal plane for a divergent beam.

Like all electromagnetic beams, lasers are subject to divergence, which is measured in milliradians (mrad) or degrees. For many applications, a lower-divergence beam is preferable. Neglecting divergence due to poor beam quality, the divergence of a laser beam is proportional to its wavelength and inversely proportional to the diameter of the beam at its narrowest point. For example, an ultraviolet laser that emits at a wavelength of 308 nm will have a lower divergence than an infrared laser at 808 nm, if both have the same minimum beam diameter. The divergence of good-quality laser beams is modeled using the mathematics of Gaussian beams.

Gaussian laser beams are said to be diffraction limited when their radial beam divergence $\theta=\Theta/2$ is close to the minimum possible value, which is given by

$$\theta = {\lambda \over\pi w_0},$$

where $\lambda$ is the laser wavelength and $w_0$ is the radius of the beam at its narrowest point, which is called the "beam waist". This type of beam divergence is observed from optimized laser cavities. Information on the diffraction-limited divergence of a coherent beam is inherently given by the N-slit interferometric equation.

== See also ==
- Laser beam profiler
- Laser linewidth
