= Pupil (disambiguation) =

The pupil is the variable-sized, black opening in the centre of the iris.

Pupil may also refer to:

- Student
  - Pupillage, a trainee barrister (England and Wales)
- Entrance pupil, the optical image of the aperture stop, as 'seen' through the front of a lens system
- Exit pupil, the image of the aperture stop in the optics that follow it
- Pupil (band), a Filipino rock band
- The Pupil (short story), 1891 short story by Henry James
- The Pupil (TV series), 2010 Singaporean drama series
