= Entocentric lens =

Compound photographic lens

An entocentric lens is a compound lens which has its entrance or exit pupil inside the lens. This is the most common type of photographic lens. The aperture diaphragm is located between the objective and the image-side focus (optics). It corresponds to the "normal" human visual impression. Distant objects appear smaller than closer objects. This doesn't occur for example on other lens or perspectives such as telecentric lens or hypercentric lens.

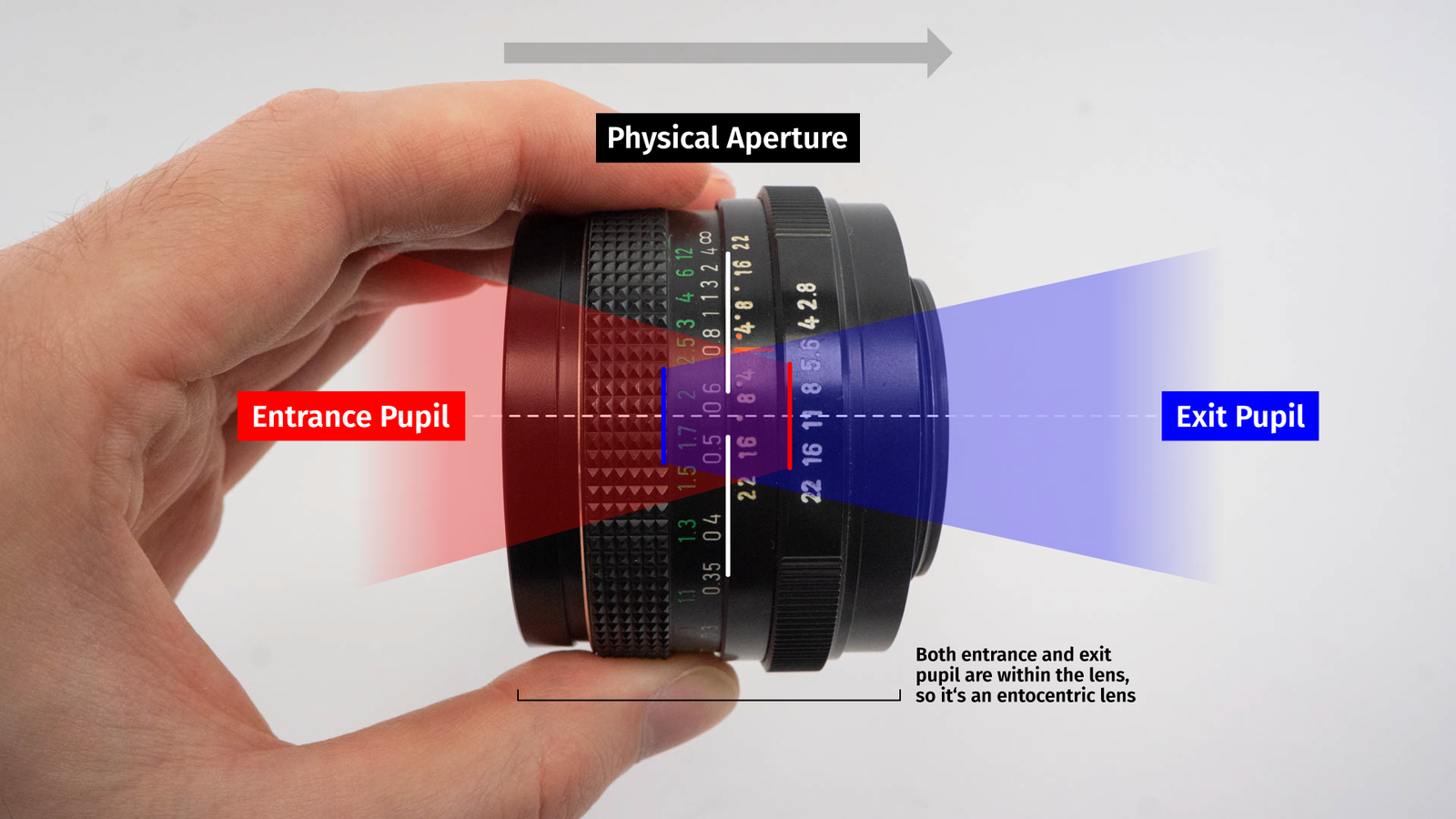
Entrance and exit pupils of an entocentric lens

== See also ==
- Telecentric lens
- Hypercentric lens
