= Hypercentric lens =

Lens system whose pupil is far in front of itself

A hypercentric or pericentric lens is a lens system where the entrance pupil is located in front of the lens, in the space where an object could be located.

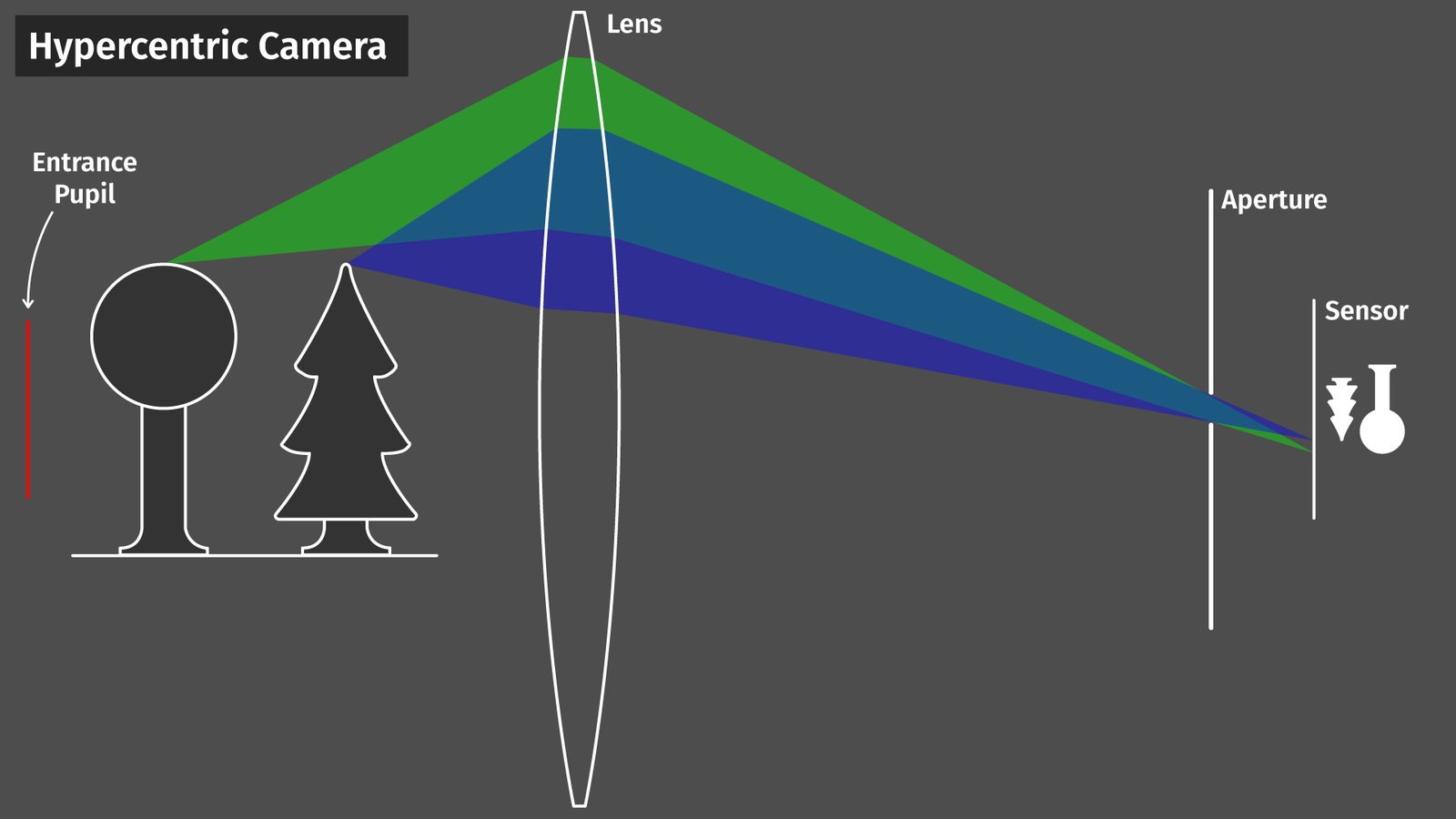
Objects further from the lens appear larger than objects closer to the lens.

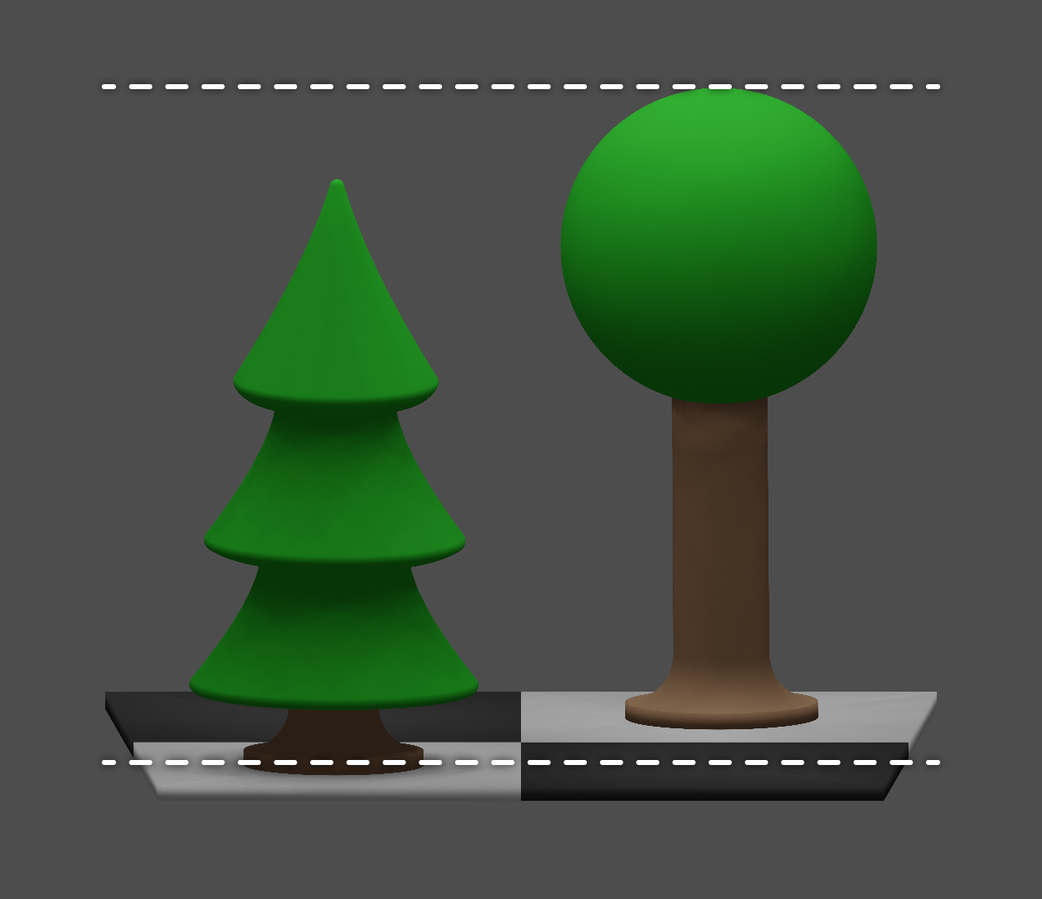
An image of the scene, acquired by the hypercentric lens

An object that is further away from the lens produces a larger image than the same object when it is closer to the lens. This is in stark contrast to the behavior of the human eye or any ordinary camera (both entocentric lenses), where further-away objects always appear smaller.

The lens must be larger than the object or scene being photographed (as shown).

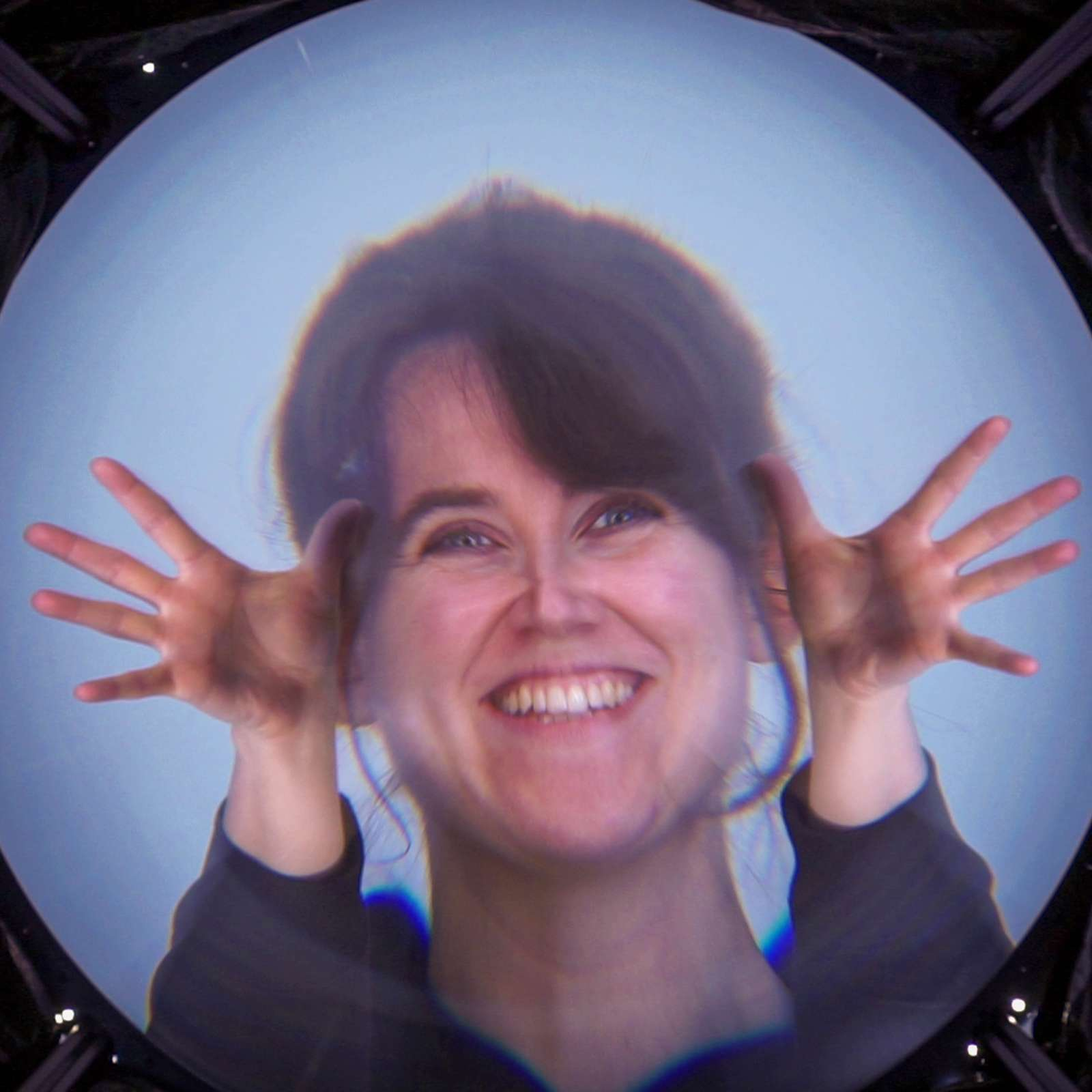
A portrait in reverse perspective

The resulting images exhibit reverse perspective (also called inverse perspective).

The geometry of a hypercentric lens can be visualized by imagining a point source of light at the center of the entrance pupil sending rays in all directions. Any point on the object will be imaged to the point on the image plane found by continuing the ray that passes through it, so the shape of the image will be the same as the shadow cast by the object from the imaginary point of light. The closer an object gets to that point (the center of the entrance pupil), the larger its image will be.

This inversion of normal perspectivity can be useful for machine vision. Imagine a six-sided die sitting on a conveyor belt being imaged by a hypercentric lens system centered directly above it, whose entrance pupil is below the conveyor belt. The image of the die would show five faces (the top and four sides), because the bottom of the die appears larger than the top, whereas a normal lens would show only the top face (or, from other locations, at-most only three faces).

== See also ==
- Entocentric lens
- Telecentric lens
