= Reverse perspective =

In art, a form of perspective drawing

Linear perspective of a cube (left) and reverse perspective (right). The viewing plane is shown in blue, with the projection point where the red lines meet.

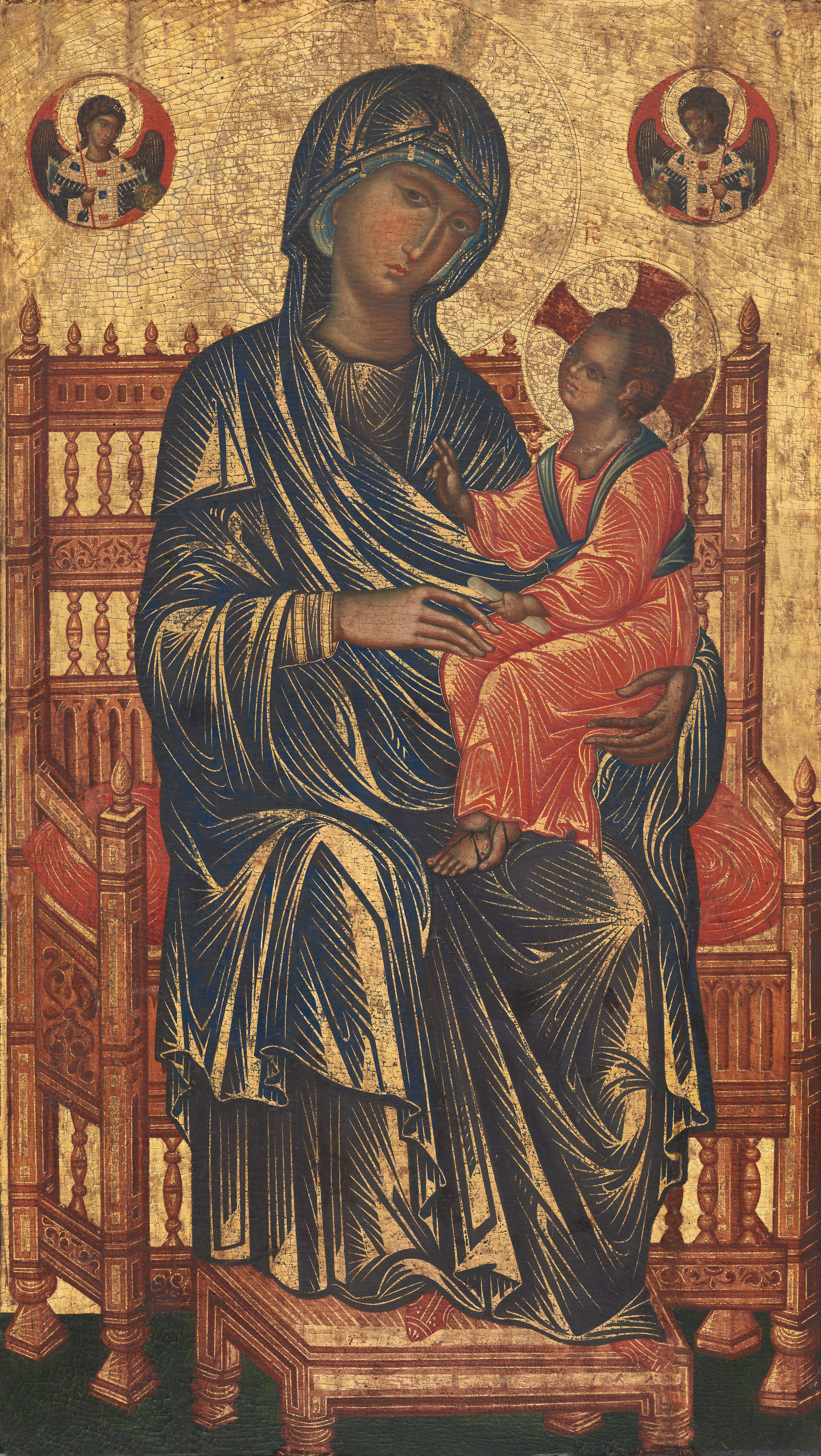
The throne and footstool in this icon show reverse perspective, with lines converging towards the viewer.

Reverse perspective, also called inverse perspective, inverted perspective, divergent perspective, or Byzantine perspective, is a form of perspective drawing where the objects depicted in a scene are placed between the projective point and the viewing plane. Objects further away from the viewing plane are drawn as larger, and closer objects are drawn as smaller, in contrast to the more conventional linear perspective where closer objects appear larger. Lines that are parallel in three-dimensional space are drawn as diverging against the horizon, rather than converging as they do in linear perspective. Technically, the vanishing points are placed outside the painting with the illusion that they are "in front of" the painting.

The name Byzantine perspective comes from the use of this perspective in Byzantine and Russian Orthodox icons; it is also found in the art of many pre-Renaissance cultures, and was sometimes used in Cubism and other movements of modern art, as well as in children's drawings. The reasons for the convention are still debated among art historians; since the artists involved in forming the convention did not have access to the more realistic linear perspective convention, it is not clear how deliberate the effects achieved were.

== See also ==
- Telecentric lens (no perspective, all objects the same size at all distances)
- Hypercentric lens (reverse perspective)
