= Telecentric lens =

Optical lens

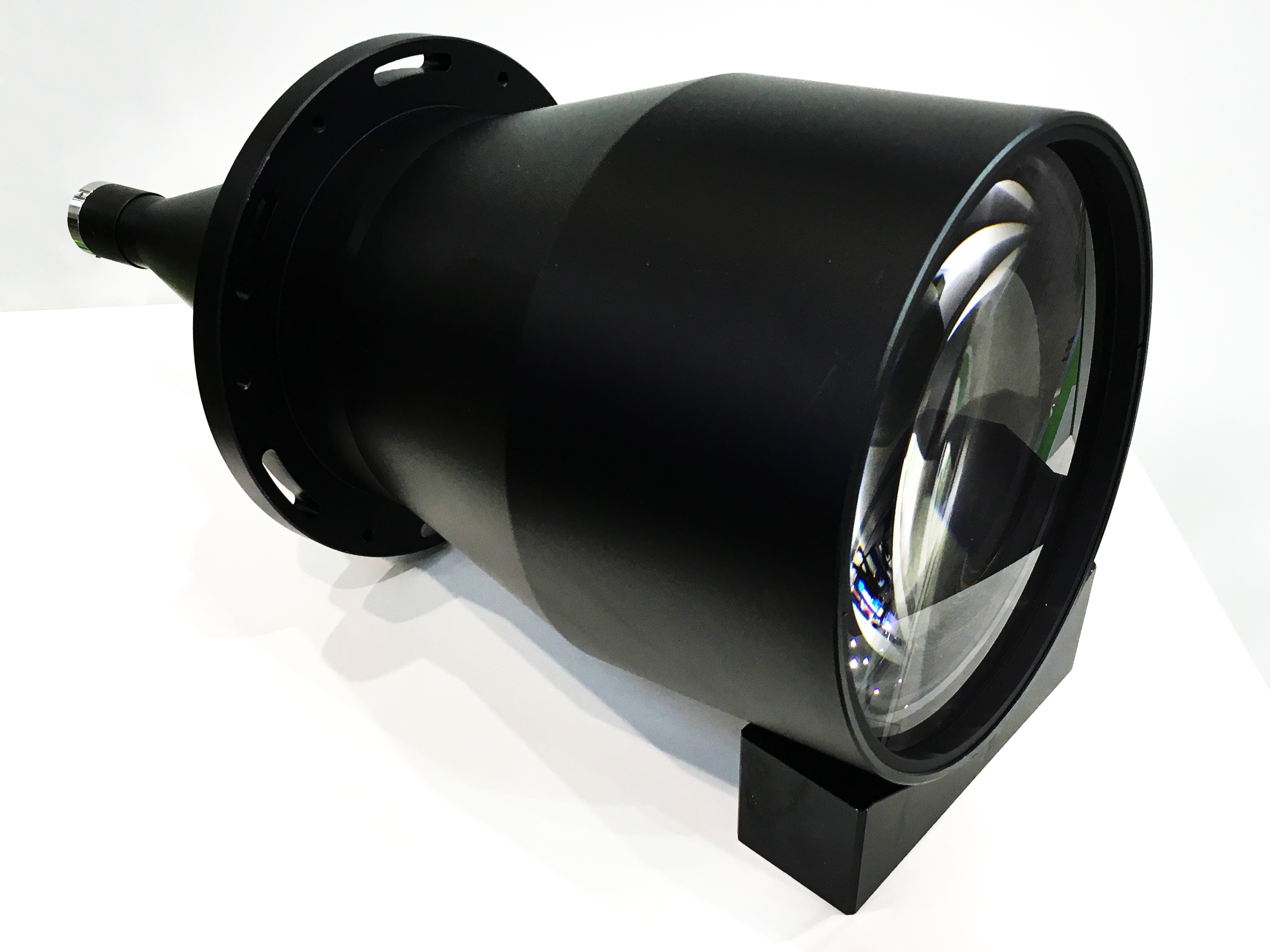
Bi-telecentric lens with 208 mm diameter front element and a C-mount camera interface

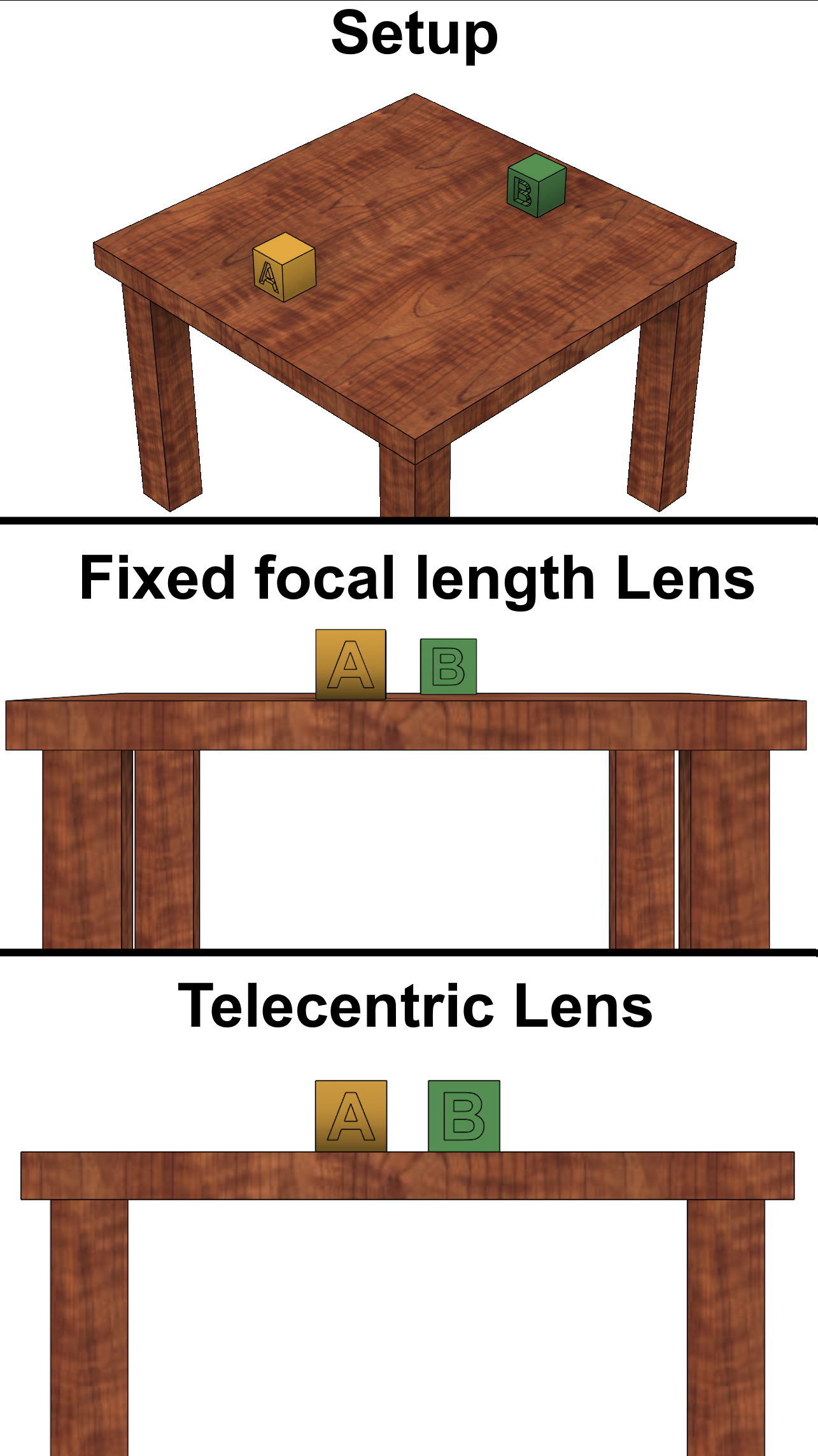
3D render simulating a photo taken with a fixed focal length and a telecentric lens

A telecentric lens is a special type of optical lens (often an objective lens or a camera lens) that has its entrance or exit pupil, or both, at infinity. Telecentric lens image magnification is insensitive to either the distance between an object being imaged and the lens, or the distance between the image plane and the lens, or both; this specialized optical property is called telecentricity. Telecentric lenses are used for precision optical two-dimensional measurements, reproduction (e.g., photolithography), and other applications that are sensitive to the image magnification or the angle of incidence of light.

A simple way to make a lens telecentric is to put the aperture stop at one of the lens's focal points. This allows only rays parallel to the optical axis (including the chief rays that pass through the center of the aperture stop) to pass from object points in the field of view through the lens to form the image. Commercially available telecentric lenses are often compound lenses that include multiple lens elements for improved optical performance. Telecentricity is not a property of these lens elements per se; it is established by the location of the aperture stop in the lens. The aperture stop selectively passes and blocks light rays passing through the lens, and the specific selection of parallel rays makes a lens telecentric.

If a lens is not telecentric, it is either entocentric or hypercentric. Common lenses are usually entocentric. In particular, a single lens without a separate aperture stop is entocentric. For such a lens the chief ray originating at any point off of the optical axis is never parallel to the optical axis, neither in front of nor behind the lens. A non-telecentric lens exhibits varying magnification for objects at different distances from the lens. An entocentric lens has a smaller magnification for objects farther away; objects of the same size appear smaller the farther they are away. A hypercentric lens produces larger images the farther the object is away.

A telecentric lens can be object-space telecentric, image-space telecentric, or bi-telecentric (also double-telecentric). In an object-space telecentric lens the image size does not change with the object distance, and in an image-space telecentric lens the image size does not change with the image-side distance from the lens.

== Object-space telecentric lenses ==
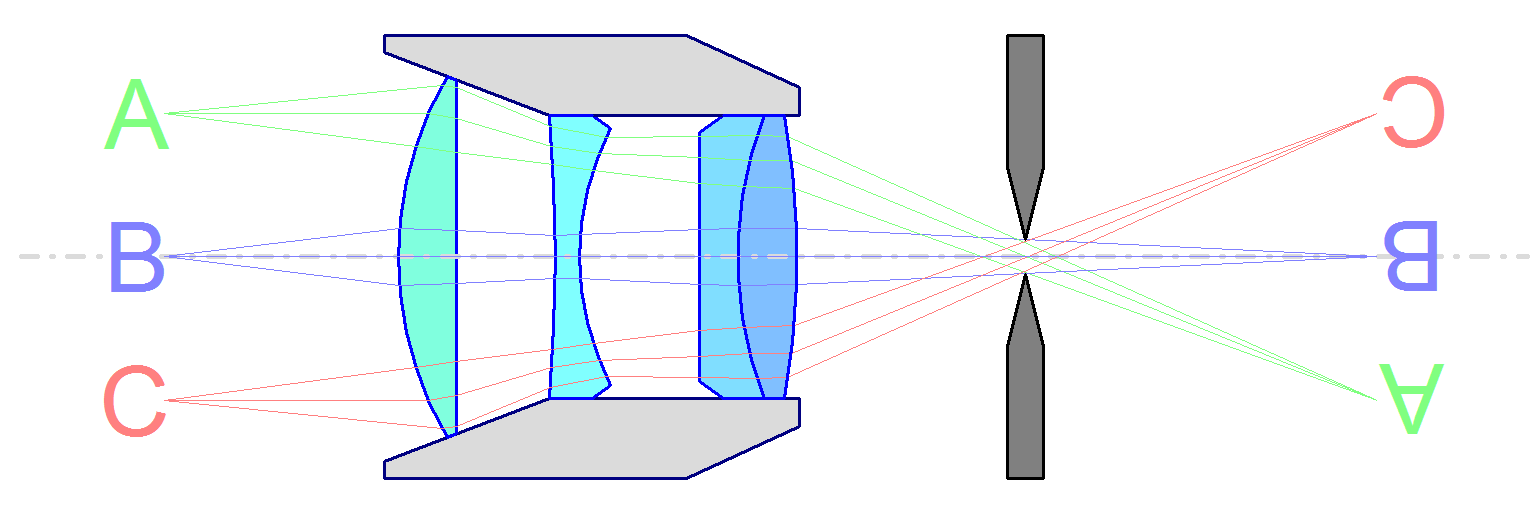
Object-space telecentric imaging where the aperture is in the back focal plane of the objective. The entrance pupil is located at infinity, and chief rays before the objective are parallel to the optical axis.

An object-space telecentric lens has the entrance pupil (the image of the lens's aperture stop, formed by optics before it) at infinity and provides an orthographic projection instead of the perspective projection in an entocentric lens. Object-space telecentric lenses have a working distance. Objects at this distance are in focus and imaged sharply onto the image sensor at flange focal distance in the camera. An object that is closer or farther is out of focus and may be blurry but will be the same size regardless of distance.

Telecentric lenses tend to be larger, heavier, and more expensive than normal lenses of similar focal length and f-number. This is partly due to the extra components needed to achieve telecentricity, and partly because the first element in an object-space telecentric lens must be at least as large as the largest object to be imaged. The front element in an object-space telecentric lens is often much larger than the camera mount. In contrast to entocentric lenses where lenses are made larger to increase the aperture for increased collection of light or shallower depth of field, a larger diameter (but otherwise similar) object-space telecentric lens is not faster than a smaller lens. Because of their intended applications, telecentric lenses often have higher resolution and transmit more light than normal photographic lenses.

Commercial object-space telecentric lenses are often characterized by their magnification, working distance and maximum image circle or image sensor size. A truly telecentric lens has no focus ring to adjust the position of the focal plane. Some commercial telecentric lenses, however, do feature a focus ring. This can be used to slightly adjust the working distance and magnification while losing a little bit of telecentricity. Sometimes, manufacturers specify a sensor resolution or pixel size to describe the optical quality of the lens and the maximum optical resolution it can achieve due to the lens's aberrations.

Because their images have constant magnification and constant viewing angle across the field of view, object-space telecentric lenses are used for metrology applications, where a machine vision system must determine the precise size and shape of objects independently from their exact distance and position within the field of view.

In order to optimize the telecentric effect when objects are illuminated from behind, an additional image-space telecentric lens can be used as a telecentric (or collimated) illuminator, which produces a parallel light flow, often from LED sources.

== Image-space telecentric lenses ==
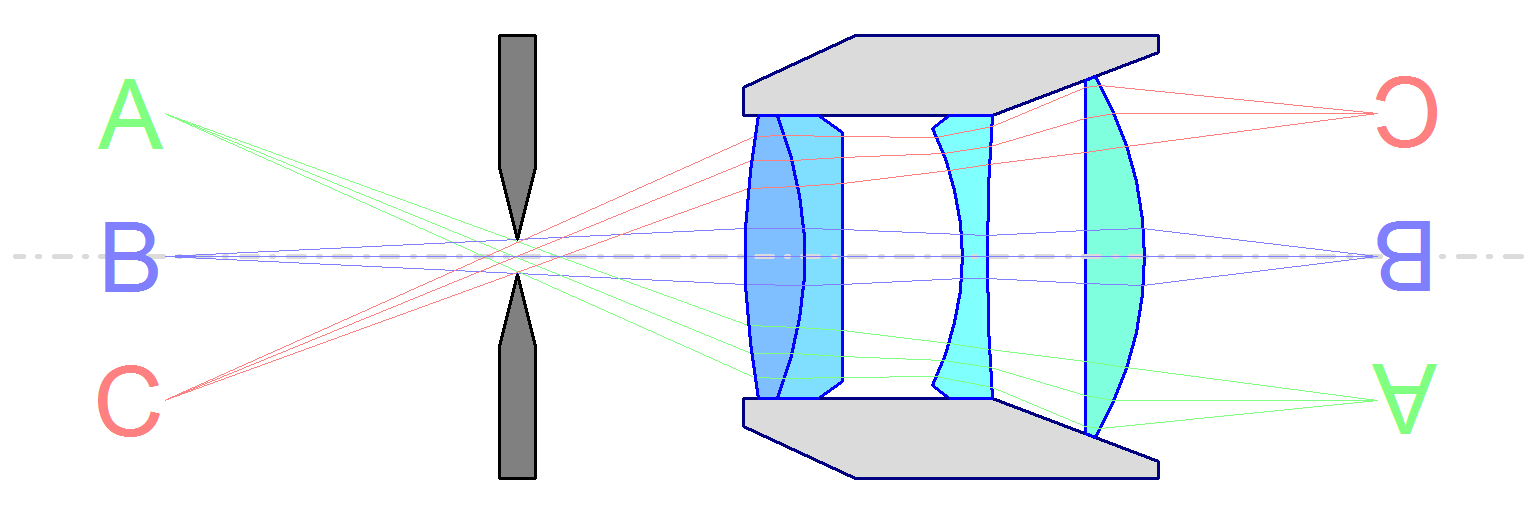
Image-space telecentric imaging where the aperture is in the front focal plane of the objective. The exit pupil is located at infinity, and chief rays after the objective are parallel to the optical axis.

An image-space telecentric lens has the exit pupil (the image of the aperture stop formed by optics after it) at infinity and produces images of the same size regardless of the distance between the lens and the film or image sensor. This allows the lens to focus light from an object or sample to different distances without changing the size of the image. An image-space telecentric lens is a reversed object-space telecentric lens, and vice versa.

Since the chief rays (light rays that pass through the center of the aperture stop) after an image-space telecentric lens are always parallel to the optical axis, these lenses are often used in applications that are sensitive to the angle of incidence of light. Interference-based color-selective beam splitters or filters but also Fabry–Pérot interferometers are two examples where image-space telecentricity is used. Another example is minimizing crosstalk between pixels in image sensors and maximizing the quantum efficiency of a sensor. The Four Thirds System initially required image-space telecentric lenses, but with the improvement of sensors, the angle of incidence requirement has been relaxed. Since every pixel is illuminated at the same angle by an image-space telecentric lens, they are also used for radiometric and color measurement applications, where one would need the irradiance to be the same regardless of the field position.

== Bi-telecentric lenses ==
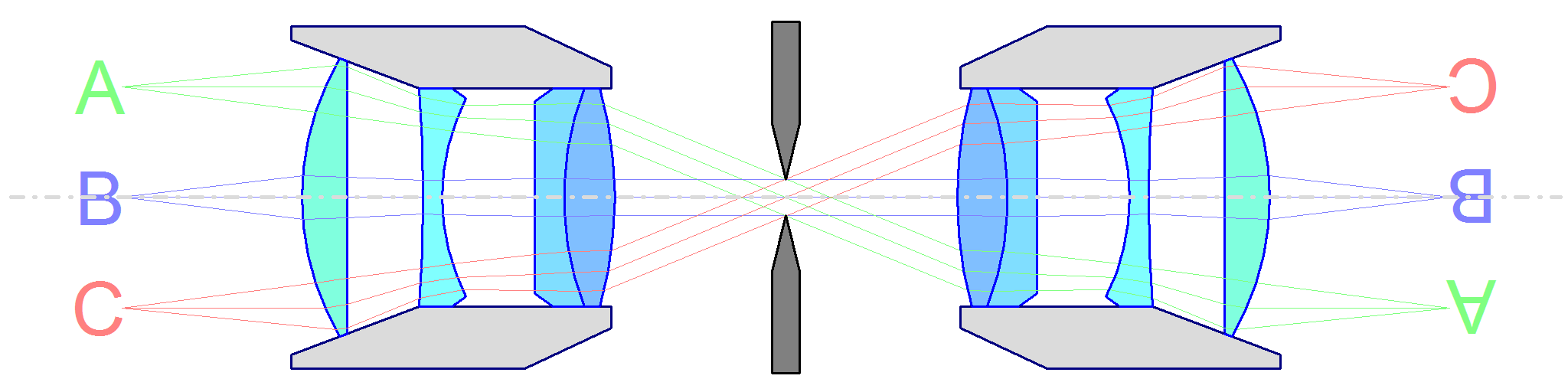
Bi-telecentric imaging where the aperture is in the common focal plane of two confocal lenses.

In a bi-telecentric (or double-telecentric) lens, both entrance and exit pupil are at infinity. The magnification is constant despite variations of both the distance of the object being observed and the image sensor from the lens, allowing more precise object size measurements than with a mono-telecentric lens (i.e., the measurements being insensitive to placement errors of the object and the image sensor).

A bi-telecentric lens is afocal, meaning that the lens does not have an effective focal length, and its cardinal points are undefined. Such a lens still forms an image, but the image size and position are calculated using different formulas than those used for typical lenses.

Commercial bi-telecentric lenses are often optimized for very low image distortion and field curvature for accurate measurements across the entire field of view at great resolution. These lenses often comprise more than 10 elements.

Large and heavy bi-telecentric lenses with many optical elements are commonly used in optical lithography (that copies a template of an electrical circuit to print or fabricate onto semiconductor wafers for mass semiconductor device production) because small image distortion and placement errors can be critical for manufactured device functionality.
