= F-number =

Measure of lens speed

Diagram of decreasing apertures, that is, increasing f-numbers, in one-stop increments; each aperture has half the light-gathering area of the previous one.

An f-number is a measure of the light-gathering ability of an optical system such as a camera lens. It is defined as the ratio of the system's focal length to the diameter of the entrance pupil ("clear aperture"). The f-number is also known as the focal ratio, f-ratio, or f-stop, and it is key in determining the depth of field, diffraction, and exposure of a photograph. The f-number is dimensionless and is usually expressed using a lower-case hooked f with the format f/N, where N is the f-number.

The f-number is also known as the inverse relative aperture, because it is the inverse of the relative aperture, defined as the aperture diameter divided by the focal length. A lower f-number means a larger relative aperture and more light entering the system, while a higher f-number means a smaller relative aperture and less light entering the system. The f-number is related to the numerical aperture (NA) of the system, which measures the range of angles over which light can enter or exit the system. The numerical aperture takes into account the refractive index of the medium in which the system is working, while the f-number does not.

The f-number is used as an indication of the light-gathering ability of a lens, i.e. the illuminance it delivers to the film or sensor for a given subject luminance. Although this usage is common, it is an approximation that ignores the effects of the focusing distance and the light transmission of the lens. When these effects cannot be ignored, the working f-number or the T-stop is used instead of the f-number.

== Notation ==
The f-number N is given by:

$$N = \frac{f}{D} \$$

where f is the focal length, and D is the diameter of the entrance pupil (effective aperture). It is customary to write f-numbers preceded by "f/", which forms a mathematical expression of the entrance pupil's diameter in terms of f and N. For example, if a lens's focal length were 100 mm and its entrance pupil's diameter were 50 mm, the f-number would be 2. This would be expressed as "f/2" in a lens system. The aperture diameter would be equal to f/2.

Camera lenses often include an adjustable diaphragm, which changes the size of the aperture stop and thus the entrance pupil size. This allows the user to vary the f-number as needed. The entrance pupil diameter is not necessarily equal to the aperture stop diameter, because of the magnifying effect of lens elements in front of the aperture.

Ignoring differences in light transmission efficiency, a lens with a greater f-number projects darker images. The brightness of the projected image (illuminance) relative to the brightness of the scene in the lens's field of view (luminance) decreases with the square of the f-number. A 100 mm focal length f/4 lens has an entrance pupil diameter of 25 mm. A 100 mm focal length f/2 lens has an entrance pupil diameter of 50 mm. Since the area is proportional to the square of the pupil diameter, the amount of light admitted by the f/2 lens is four times that of the f/4 lens. To obtain the same photographic exposure, the exposure time must be reduced by a factor of four.

A 200 mm focal length f/4 lens has an entrance pupil diameter of 50 mm. The 200 mm lens's entrance pupil has four times the area of the 100 mm f/4 lens's entrance pupil, and thus collects four times as much light from each object in the lens's field of view. But compared to the 100 mm lens, the 200 mm lens projects an image of each object twice as high and twice as wide, covering four times the area, and so both lenses produce the same illuminance at the focal plane when imaging a scene of a given luminance.

== Conventional scales ==
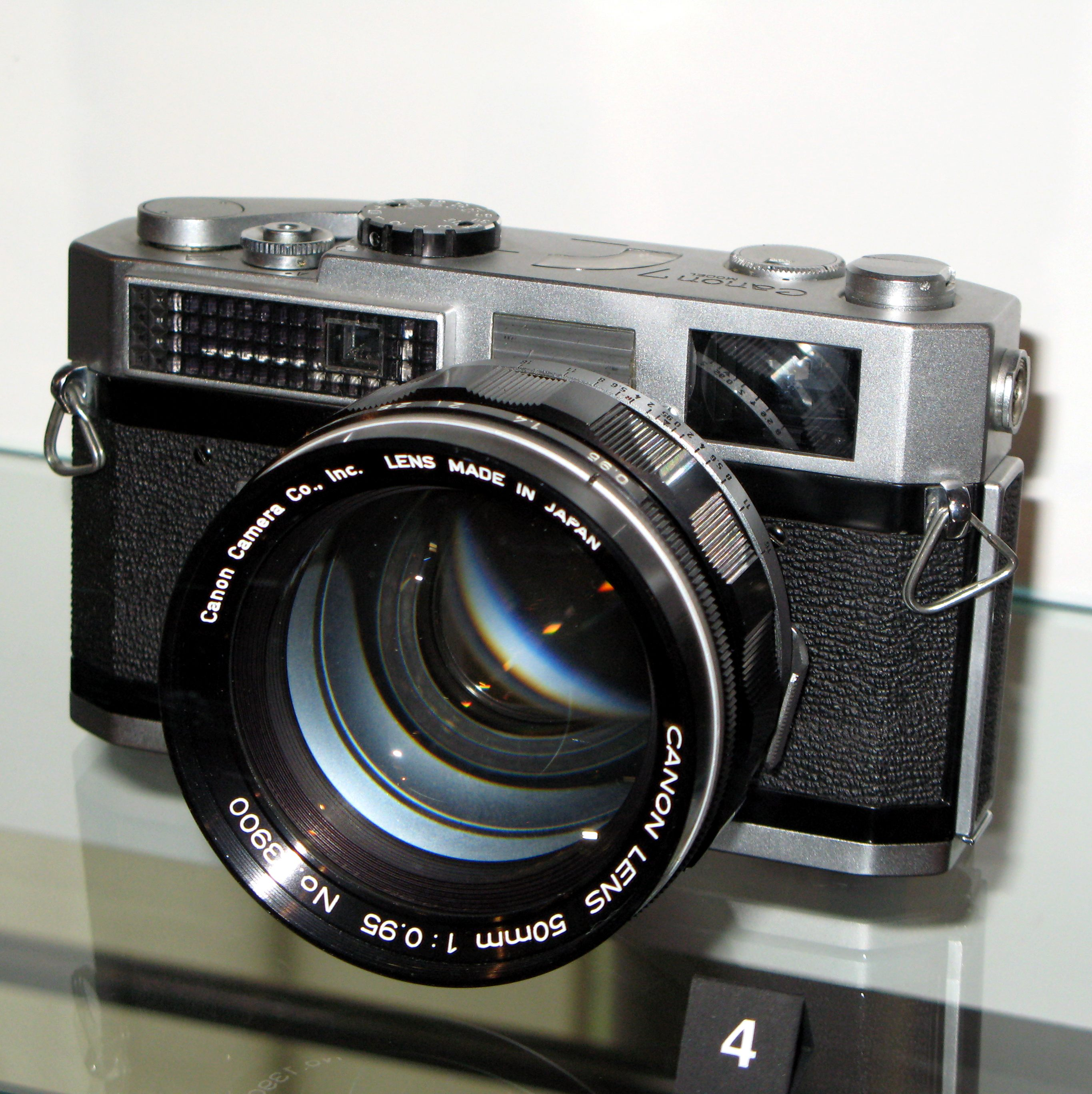
A Canon 7 mounted with a 50 mm lens capable of f/0.95

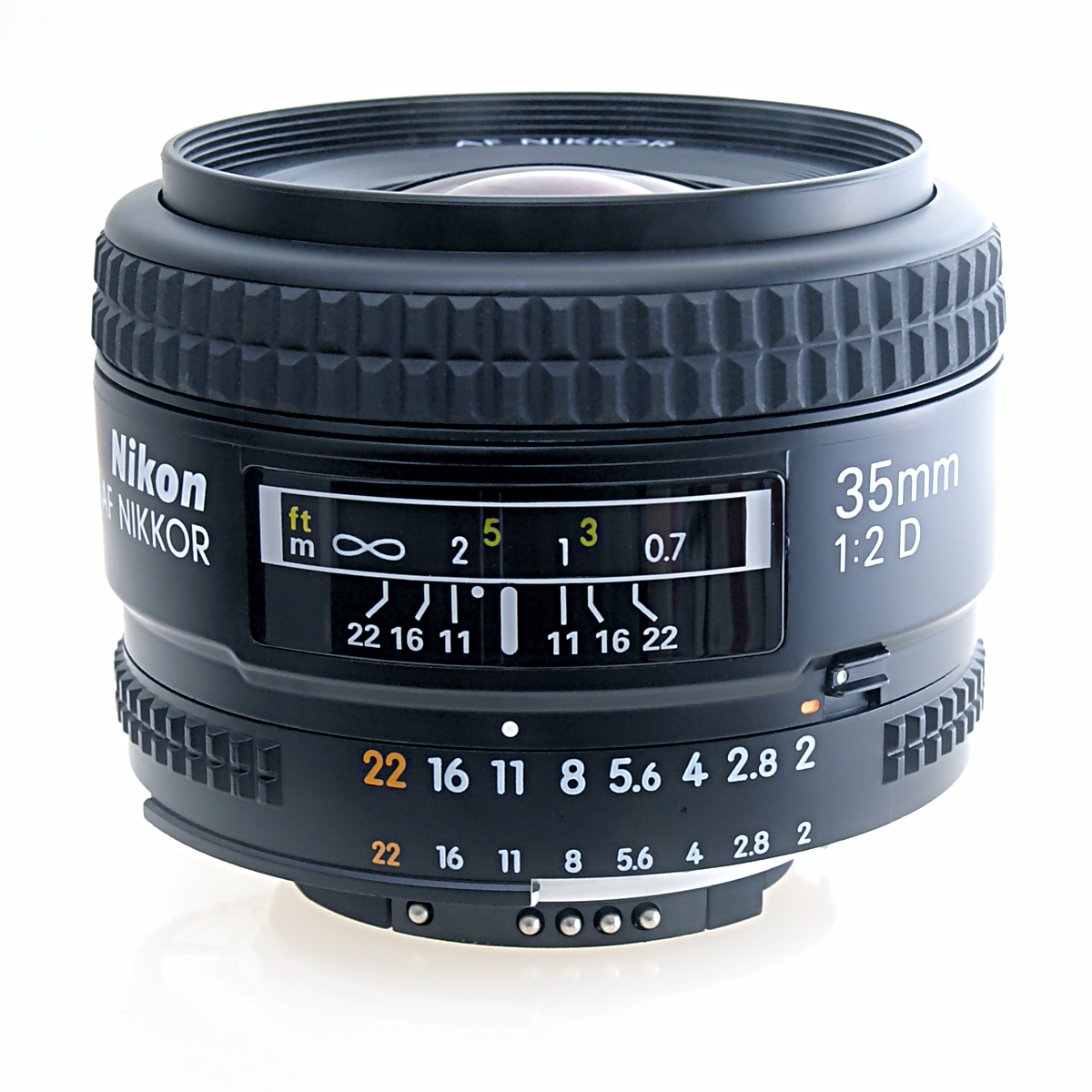
A 35 mm lens set to f/11, as indicated by the white dot above the f-stop scale on the aperture ring. This lens has an aperture range of f/2 to f/22.

The word stop is sometimes confusing due to its multiple meanings. A stop can be a physical object: an opaque part of an optical system that blocks certain rays. The aperture stop is the aperture setting that limits the brightness of the image by restricting the input pupil size, while a field stop is a stop intended to cut out light that would be outside the desired field of view and might cause flare or other problems if not stopped.

In photography, stops are also a unit used to quantify ratios of light or exposure, with each added stop meaning a factor of two, and each subtracted stop meaning a factor of one-half. The one-stop unit is also known as the EV (exposure value) unit. On a camera, the aperture setting is traditionally adjusted in discrete steps, known as f-stops. Each "stop" is marked with its corresponding f-number, and represents a halving of the light intensity from the previous stop. This corresponds to a decrease of the pupil and aperture diameters by a factor of 1/√2 or about 0.7071, and hence a halving of the area of the pupil.

Most modern lenses use a standard f-stop scale, which is an approximately geometric sequence of numbers that corresponds to the sequence of the powers of the square root of 2: f/1, f/1.4, f/2, f/2.8, f/4, f/5.6, f/8, f/11, f/16, f/22, f/32, f/45, f/64, f/90, f/128, etc. Each element in the sequence is one stop lower than the element to its left, and one stop higher than the element to its right. The values of the ratios are rounded off to these particular conventional numbers, to make them easier to remember and write down. The sequence above is obtained by approximating the following exact geometric sequence:

$$f/1 = \frac{f}{(\sqrt{2})^0},\ f/1.4 = \frac{f}{(\sqrt{2})^1},\ f/2 = \frac{f}{(\sqrt{2})^2},\ f/2.8 = \frac{f}{(\sqrt{2})^3},\ \ldots$$
In the same way as one f-stop corresponds to a factor of two in light intensity, shutter speeds are arranged so that each setting differs in duration by a factor of approximately two from its neighbour. Opening up a lens by one stop allows twice as much light to fall on the film in a given period of time. Therefore, to have the same exposure at this larger aperture as at the previous aperture, the shutter would be opened for half as long (i.e., twice the speed). The film will respond equally to these equal amounts of light, since it has the property of reciprocity. This is less true for extremely long or short exposures, where there is reciprocity failure. Aperture, shutter speed, and film sensitivity are linked: for constant scene brightness, doubling the aperture area (one stop), halving the shutter speed (doubling the time open), or using a film twice as sensitive, has the same effect on the exposed image. For all practical purposes extreme accuracy is not required (mechanical shutter speeds were notoriously inaccurate as wear and lubrication varied, with no effect on exposure). It is not significant that aperture areas and shutter speeds do not vary by a factor of precisely two.

Photographers sometimes express other exposure ratios in terms of 'stops'. Ignoring the f-number markings, the f-stops make a logarithmic scale of exposure intensity. Given this interpretation, one can then think of taking a half-step along this scale, to make an exposure difference of a "half stop".

=== Fractional stops ===
Computer simulation showing the effects of changing a camera's aperture in half-stops (at left) and from zero to infinity (at right)

Most twentieth-century cameras had a continuously variable aperture, using an iris diaphragm, with each full stop marked. Click-stopped aperture came into common use in the 1960s; the aperture scale usually had a click stop at every whole and half stop.

On modern cameras, especially when aperture is set on the camera body, f-number is often divided more finely than steps of one stop. Steps of one-third stop (1/3 EV) are the most common, since this matches the ISO system of film speeds. Half-stop steps are used on some cameras. Usually the full stops are marked, and the intermediate positions click but are not marked. As an example, the aperture that is one-third stop smaller than f/2.8 is f/3.2, two-thirds smaller is f/3.5, and one whole stop smaller is f/4. The next few f-stops in this sequence are:

$$f/4.5,\ f/5,\ f/5.6,\ f/6.3,\ f/7.1,\ f/8,\ \ldots$$

To calculate the steps in a full stop (1 EV) one could use

$$(\sqrt{2})^{0},\ (\sqrt{2})^{1},\ (\sqrt{2})^{2},\ (\sqrt{2})^{3},\ (\sqrt{2})^{4},\ \ldots$$

The steps in a half stop (1/2 EV) series would be

$$(\sqrt{2})^{\frac{0}{2}},\ (\sqrt{2})^{\frac{1}{2}},\ (\sqrt{2})^{\frac{2}{2}},\ (\sqrt{2})^{\frac{3}{2}},\ (\sqrt{2})^{\frac{4}{2}},\ \ldots$$

The steps in a third stop (1/3 EV) series would be

$$(\sqrt{2})^{\frac{0}{3}},\ (\sqrt{2})^{\frac{1}{3}},\ (\sqrt{2})^{\frac{2}{3}},\ (\sqrt{2})^{\frac{3}{3}},\ (\sqrt{2})^{\frac{4}{3}},\ \ldots$$

As in the earlier DIN and ASA film-speed standards, the ISO speed is defined only in one-third stop increments, and shutter speeds of digital cameras are commonly on the same scale in reciprocal seconds. A portion of the ISO range is the sequence

$$\ldots 16/13^\circ,\ 20/14^\circ,\ 25/15^\circ,\ 32/16^\circ,\ 40/17^\circ,\ 50/18^\circ,\ 64/19^\circ,\ 80/20^\circ,\ 100/21^\circ,\ 125/22^\circ,\ \ldots$$

while shutter speeds in reciprocal seconds have a few conventional differences in their numbers (1/15, 1/30, and 1/60 second instead of 1/16, 1/32, and 1/64).

In practice the maximum aperture of a lens is often not an integral power of √2 (i.e., √2 to the power of a whole number), in which case it is usually a half or third stop above or below an integral power of √2.

Modern electronically controlled interchangeable lenses, such as those used for SLR cameras, have f-stops specified internally in 1/8-stop increments, so the cameras' 1/3-stop settings are approximated by the nearest 1/8-stop setting in the lens.

=== Standard full-stop f-number scale ===
Including aperture value AV:
$$N = \sqrt{2^{\text{AV}}}$$

Conventional and calculated f-numbers, full-stop series:

AV	−2	−1	0	1	2	3	4	5	6	7	8	9	10	11	12	13	14	15	16
N	0.5	0.7	1.0	1.4	2	2.8	4	5.6	8	11	16	22	32	45	64	90	128	180	256
calculated	0.5	0.707...	1.0	1.414...	2.0	2.828...	4.0	5.657...	8.0	11.31...	16.0	22.62...	32.0	45.25...	64.0	90.51...	128.0	181.02...	256.0

=== Typical one-half-stop f-number scale ===
AV	−1	−1/2	0	1/2	1	1 1/2	2	2 1/2	3	3 1/2	4	4 1/2	5	5 1/2	6	6 1/2	7	7 1/2	8	8 1/2	9	9 1/2	10	10 1/2	11	11 1/2	12	12 1/2	13	13 1/2	14
N	0.7	0.8	1.0	1.2	1.4	1.7	2	2.4	2.8	3.3	4	4.8	5.6	6.7	8	9.5	11	13	16	19	22	27	32	38	45	54	64	76	90	107	128

=== Typical one-third-stop f-number scale ===
AV	−1	−2/3	−1/3	0	1/3	2/3	1	1 1/3	1 2/3	2	2 1/3	2 2/3	3	3 1/3	3 2/3	4	4 1/3	4 2/3	5	5 1/3	5 2/3	6	6 1/3	6 2/3	7	7 1/3	7 2/3	8	8 1/3	8 2/3	9	9 1/3	9 2/3	10	10 1/3	10 2/3	11	11 1/3	11 2/3	12	12 1/3	12 2/3	13
N	0.7	0.8	0.9	1.0	1.1	1.2	1.4	1.6	1.8	2	2.2	2.5	2.8	3.2	3.5	4	4.5	5.0	5.6	6.3	7.1	8	9	10	11	13	14	16	18	20	22	25	29	32	36	40	45	51	57	64	72	80	90

Sometimes the same number is included on several scales; for example, an aperture of f/1.2 may be used in either a half-stop or a one-third-stop system; sometimes f/1.3 and f/3.2 and other differences are used for the one-third stop scale.

=== Typical one-quarter-stop f-number scale ===
AV	0	1/4	1/2	3/4	1	1 1/4	1 1/2	1 3/4	2	2 1/4	2 1/2	2 3/4	3	3 1/4	3 1/2	3 3/4	4	4 1/4	4 1/2	4 3/4	5
N	1.0	1.1	1.2	1.3	1.4	1.5	1.7	1.8	2	2.2	2.4	2.6	2.8	3.1	3.3	3.7	4	4.4	4.8	5.2	5.6

AV	5	5 1/4	5 1/2	5 3/4	6	6 1/4	6 1/2	6 3/4	7	7 1/4	7 1/2	7 3/4	8	8 1/4	8 1/2	8 3/4	9	9 1/4	9 1/2	9 3/4	10
N	5.6	6.2	6.7	7.3	8	8.7	9.5	10	11	12	14	15	16	17	19	21	22	25	27	29	32

== Effect on exposure ==
=== Camera equation ===
Upon taking a photograph, the exposure H received by the surface of the film or sensor is defined as

$H = E t$

where E is the illuminance falling on that surface and t is the exposure time. The illuminance in turn depends on the brightness of the subject being photographed, and on the aperture of the lens. If we assume the lens has no transmission losses and is focused at infinity, the image-plane illuminance is:

$E = L \frac{\pi}{4N^2}$

where L is the subject luminance (an objective measure of its brightness).

If the lens is focused at close range, the illuminance is lower, and this can be accounted for by replacing the f-number with the so-called “working f-number”. In the same vein, if the transmission losses cannot be neglected, the f-number should be replaced by the T-stop.

=== Working f-number ===
The f-number accurately describes the light-gathering ability of a lens only for objects an infinite distance away. This limitation is typically ignored in photography, where f-number is often used regardless of the distance to the object. In optical design, an alternative is often needed for systems where the object is not far from the lens. In these cases the working f-number is used. The working f-number N_{w} is given by:

$$N_w \approx {1 \over 2 \mathrm{NA}_i} \approx \left(1+\frac{|m|}{P}\right)N\,,$$

where N is the uncorrected f-number, NA_{i} is the image-space numerical aperture of the lens, $|m|$ is the absolute value of the lens's magnification for an object a particular distance away, and P is the pupil magnification. Since the pupil magnification is seldom known it is often assumed to be 1, which is the correct value for all symmetric lenses.

In photography this means that as one focuses closer, the lens's effective aperture becomes smaller, making the exposure darker. The working f-number is often described in photography as the f-number corrected for lens extensions by a bellows factor. This is of particular importance in macro photography.

=== T-stop ===
A T-stop (for transmission stops, by convention written with capital letter T) is an f-number adjusted to account for light transmission efficiency (transmittance). A lens with a T-stop of N projects an image of the same brightness as an ideal lens with 100% transmittance and an f-number of N. A particular lens's T-stop, T, is given by dividing the f-number by the square root of the transmittance of that lens:
$$T = \frac{N}{\sqrt{\text{transmittance}}}.$$
For example, an f/2.0 lens with transmittance of 75% has a T-stop of 2.3:
$$T = \frac{2.0}{\sqrt{0.75}} = 2.309...$$
Since real lenses have transmittances of less than 100%, a lens's T-stop number is always greater than its f-number.

Because about 4% of incident visible light is reflected at each uncoated glass surface, losses add up quickly in lenses with many elements, and multicoating of lenses is the key in lens design to decrease transmittance losses of lenses. Some reviews of lenses do measure the T-stop or transmission rate in their benchmarks. T-stops are sometimes used instead of f-numbers to more accurately determine exposure, particularly when using external light meters. Lens transmittances of 60%–95% are typical. T-stops are often used in cinematography, where many images are seen in rapid succession and even small changes in exposure will be noticeable. Cinema camera lenses are typically calibrated in T-stops instead of f-numbers. In still photography, without the need for rigorous consistency of all lenses and cameras used, slight differences in exposure are less important; however, T-stops are still used in some kinds of special-purpose lenses such as Smooth Trans Focus lenses by Minolta and Sony.

=== H-stop ===
An H-stop (for hole, by convention written with capital letter H) is an f-number equivalent for effective exposure based on the area covered by the holes in the diffusion discs or sieve aperture found in Rodenstock Imagon lenses.

=== ASA/ISO numbers ===
Photographic film's and electronic camera sensor's sensitivity to light is often specified using ASA/ISO numbers. Both systems have a linear number where a doubling of sensitivity is represented by a doubling of the number, and a logarithmic number. In the ISO system, a 3° increase in the logarithmic number corresponds approximately to a doubling of sensitivity. Doubling or halving the sensitivity is equal to a difference of one T-stop in terms of light transmittance.

=== Gain ===
Iris/gain relationship on Panasonic camcorders as described in the HC-V785 operating manual

Most electronic cameras allow the user to adjust the amplification of the signal coming from the image sensor. This amplification is usually called gain and is measured in decibels. A 6 dB of gain is roughly equivalent to one T-stop in terms of light transmittance. Many camcorders have a unified control over the lens f-number and gain. In this case, starting from (arbitrarily defined) zero gain and a fully open iris, one can either increase the f-number by reducing the iris size while gain remains zero, or increase the gain while the iris remains fully open.

=== Sunny 16 rule ===
An example of the use of f-numbers in photography is the sunny 16 rule: an approximately correct exposure will be obtained on a sunny day by using an aperture of f/16 and the shutter speed closest to the reciprocal of the ISO speed of the film; for example, using ISO 200 film, an aperture of f/16 and a shutter speed of 1/200 second. The f-number may then be adjusted downwards for situations with lower light. Selecting a lower f-number is "opening up" the lens. Selecting a higher f-number is "closing" or "stopping down" the lens.

== Effects on image sharpness ==
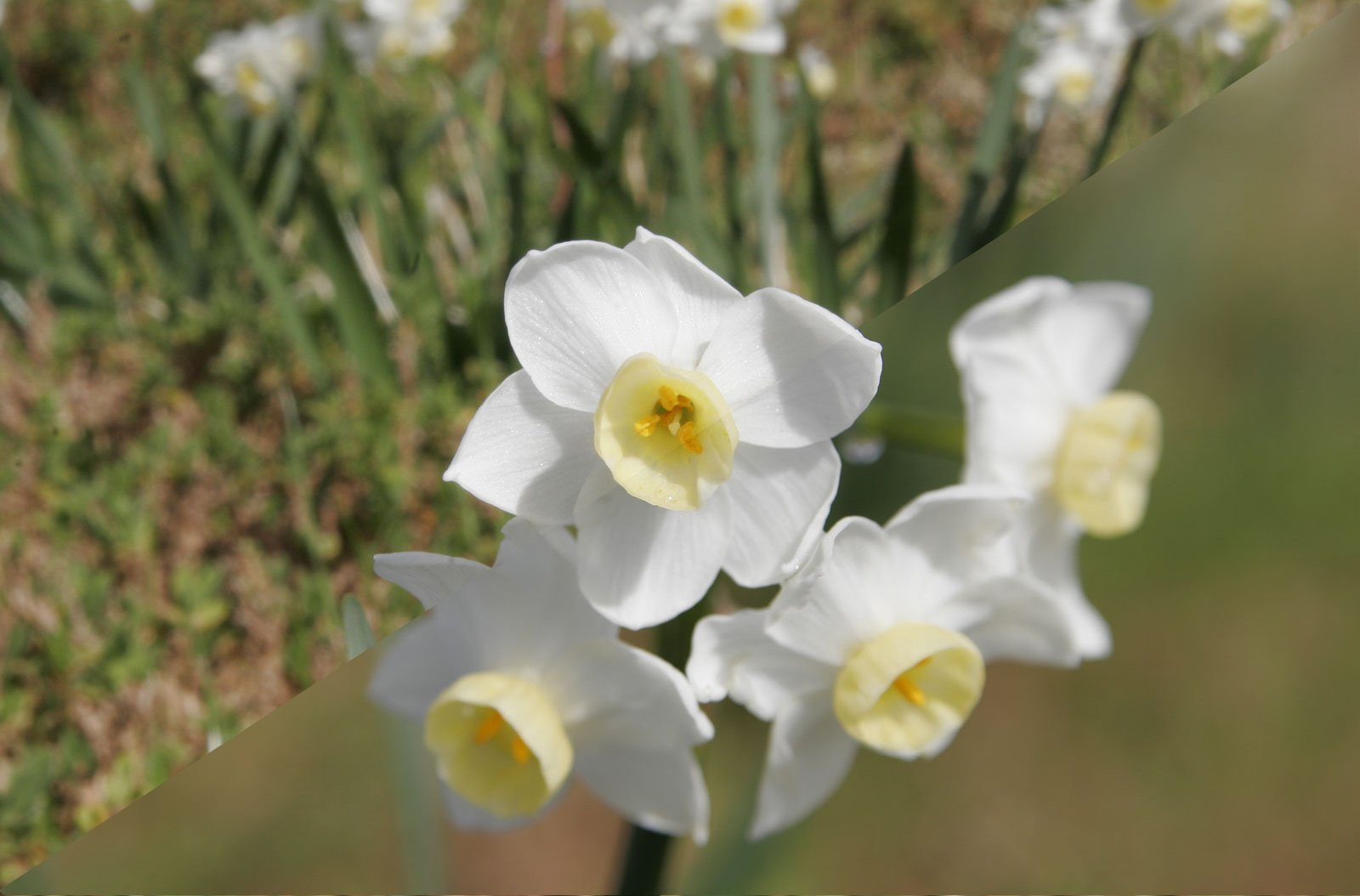
Comparison of f/32 (top-left half) and f/5 (bottom-right half)

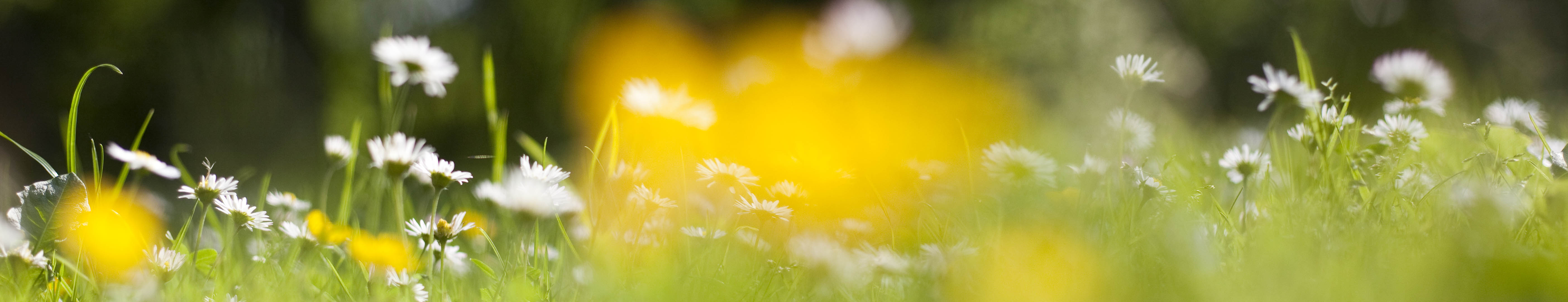
Shallow focus with a wide open lens

Depth of field increases with f-number, as illustrated in the image here. This means that photographs taken with a low f-number (large aperture) will tend to have subjects at one distance in focus, with the rest of the image (nearer and farther elements) out of focus. This is frequently used for nature photography and portraiture because background blur (the aesthetic quality known as 'bokeh') can be aesthetically pleasing and puts the viewer's focus on the main subject in the foreground. The depth of field of an image produced at a given f-number is dependent on other parameters as well, including the focal length, the subject distance, and the format of the film or sensor used to capture the image. Depth of field can be described as depending on just angle of view, subject distance, and entrance pupil diameter (as in von Rohr's method). As a result, smaller formats will have a deeper field than larger formats at the same f-number for the same distance of focus and same angle of view since a smaller format requires a shorter focal length (wider angle lens) to produce the same angle of view, and depth of field increases with shorter focal lengths. Therefore, reduced–depth-of-field effects will require smaller f-numbers (and thus potentially more difficult or complex optics) when using small-format cameras than when using larger-format cameras.

Beyond focus, image sharpness is related to f-number through two different optical effects: aberration, due to imperfect lens design, and diffraction which is due to the wave nature of light. The blur-optimal f-stop varies with the lens design. For modern standard lenses having six or seven elements, the sharpest image is often obtained around f/5.6–f/8, while for older standard lenses having only four elements (Tessar formula) stopping to f/11 will give the sharpest image. The larger number of elements in modern lenses allow the designer to compensate for aberrations, allowing the lens to give better pictures at lower f-numbers. At small apertures, depth of field and aberrations are improved, but diffraction creates more spreading of the light, causing blur.

Light falloff is also sensitive to f-stop. Many wide-angle lenses will show a significant light falloff (vignetting) at the edges for large apertures.

Photojournalists have a saying, "f/8 and be there", meaning that being on the scene is more important than worrying about technical details. Practically, f/8 (in 35 mm and larger formats) allows adequate depth of field and sufficient lens speed for a decent base exposure in most daylight situations.

== Human eye ==
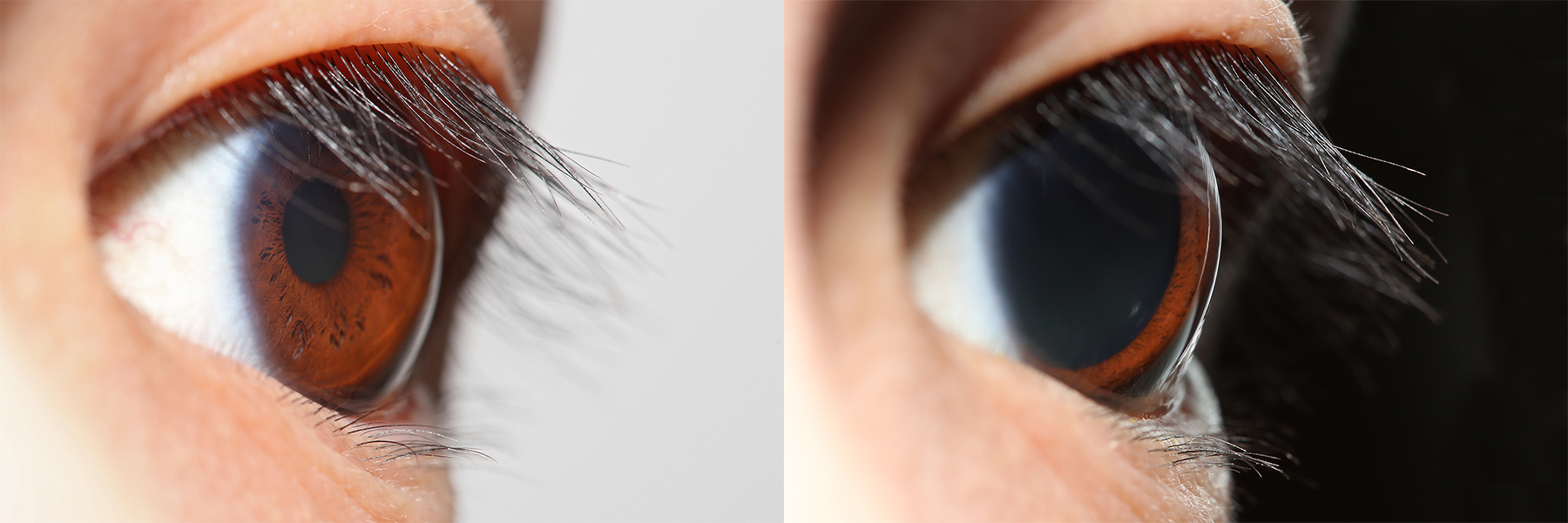
The human pupil in its constricted (3 mm) and fully dilated (9 mm) states. At 9 mm, the effective f-number is approximately f/1.6.

Computing the f-number of the human eye involves computing the physical aperture and focal length of the eye. Typically, the pupil can dilate to be as large as 6–7 mm in darkness, which translates into the maximal physical aperture. Some individuals' pupils can dilate to over 9 mm wide.

The f-number of the human eye varies from about f/8.3 in a very brightly lit place to about f/2.1 in the dark. Computing the focal length requires that the light-refracting properties of the liquids in the eye be taken into account. Treating the eye as an ordinary air-filled camera and lens results in an incorrect focal length and f-number.

== Focal ratio in telescopes ==
Diagram of the focal ratio of a simple optical system where $f$ is the focal length and $D$ is the diameter of the objective

In astronomy, the f-number is commonly referred to as the focal ratio (or f-ratio) notated as $N$. It is still defined as the focal length $f$ of an objective divided by its diameter $D$ or by the diameter of an aperture stop in the system:

$$N = \frac fD \quad \xrightarrow {\times D} \quad f = ND$$

Even though the principles of focal ratio are always the same, the application to which the principle is put can differ. In photography the focal ratio varies the focal-plane illuminance (or optical power per unit area in the image) and is used to control variables such as depth of field. When using an optical telescope in astronomy, there is no depth of field issue, and the brightness of stellar point sources in terms of total optical power (not divided by area) is a function of absolute aperture area only, independent of focal length. The focal length controls the field of view of the instrument and the scale of the image that is presented at the focal plane to an eyepiece, film plate, or CCD.

For example, the SOAR four-meter telescope has a small field of view (about f/16) which is useful for stellar studies. The 8.4 m Simonyi Survey Telescope of the Vera C. Rubin Observatory (planned as the Large Synoptic Survey Telescope, LSST), designed to cover the entire sky every three days, has a very large field of view of 9.6 square degrees and a final focal ratio of f/1.234. Its short 10.3 m focal length is made possible by an error correction system which includes secondary and tertiary mirrors, a three element refractive system and active mounting and optics.

== History ==
The system of f-numbers for specifying relative apertures evolved in the late nineteenth century, in competition with several other systems of aperture notation.

=== Origins of relative aperture ===
In 1867, Sutton and Dawson defined "apertal ratio" as essentially the reciprocal of the modern f-number. In the following quote, an "apertal ratio" of "1/24" is calculated as the ratio of 6 inches (150 mm) to 1/4 inch (6.4 mm), corresponding to an f/24 f-stop:

In every lens there is, corresponding to a given apertal ratio (that is, the ratio of the diameter of the stop to the focal length), a certain distance of a near object from it, between which and infinity all objects are in equally good focus. For instance, in a single view lens of 6-inch focus, with a 1/4 in. stop (apertal ratio one-twenty-fourth), all objects situated at distances lying between 20 feet from the lens and an infinite distance from it (a fixed star, for instance) are in equally good focus. Twenty feet is therefore called the 'focal range' of the lens when this stop is used. The focal range is consequently the distance of the nearest object, which will be in good focus when the ground glass is adjusted for an extremely distant object. In the same lens, the focal range will depend upon the size of the diaphragm used, while in different lenses having the same apertal ratio the focal ranges will be greater as the focal length of the lens is increased. The terms 'apertal ratio' and 'focal range' have not come into general use, but it is very desirable that they should, in order to prevent ambiguity and circumlocution when treating of the properties of photographic lenses.

In 1874, John Henry Dallmeyer called the ratio $1/N$ the "intensity ratio" of a lens:

The rapidity of a lens depends upon the relation or ratio of the aperture to the equivalent focus. To ascertain this, divide the equivalent focus by the diameter of the actual working aperture of the lens in question; and note down the quotient as the denominator with 1, or unity, for the numerator. Thus to find the ratio of a lens of 2 inches diameter and 6 inches focus, divide the focus by the aperture, or 6 divided by 2 equals 3; i.e., 1/3 is the intensity ratio.

Although he did not yet have access to Ernst Abbe's theory of stops and pupils, which was made widely available by Siegfried Czapski in 1893, Dallmeyer knew that his working aperture was not the same as the physical diameter of the aperture stop:

It must be observed, however, that in order to find the real intensity ratio, the diameter of the actual working aperture must be ascertained. This is easily accomplished in the case of single lenses, or for double combination lenses used with the full opening, these merely requiring the application of a pair of compasses or rule; but when double or triple-combination lenses are used, with stops inserted between the combinations, it is somewhat more troublesome; for it is obvious that in this case the diameter of the stop employed is not the measure of the actual pencil of light transmitted by the front combination. To ascertain this, focus for a distant object, remove the focusing screen and replace it by the collodion slide, having previously inserted a piece of cardboard in place of the prepared plate. Make a small round hole in the centre of the cardboard with a piercer, and now remove to a darkened room; apply a candle close to the hole, and observe the illuminated patch visible upon the front combination; the diameter of this circle, carefully measured, is the actual working aperture of the lens in question for the particular stop employed.

This point is further emphasized by Czapski in 1893. According to an English review of his book, in 1894, "The necessity of clearly distinguishing between effective aperture and diameter of physical stop is strongly insisted upon."

J. H. Dallmeyer's son, Thomas Rudolphus Dallmeyer, inventor of the telephoto lens, followed the intensity ratio terminology in 1899.

=== Aperture numbering systems ===
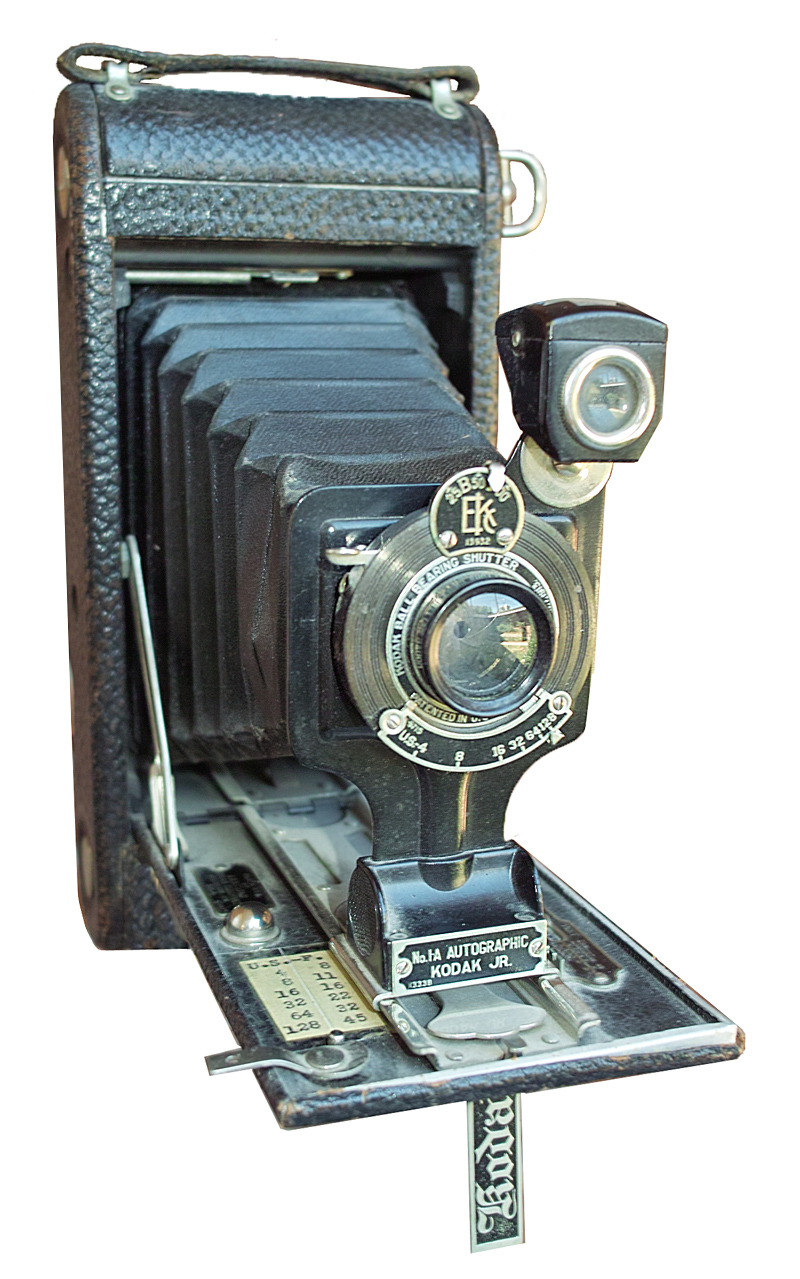
A 1922 Kodak with aperture marked in U.S. stops. An f-number conversion chart has been added by the user.

At the same time, there were a number of aperture numbering systems designed with the goal of making exposure times vary in direct or inverse proportion with the aperture, rather than with the square of the f-number or inverse square of the apertal ratio or intensity ratio. But these systems all involved some arbitrary constant, as opposed to the simple ratio of focal length and diameter.

For example, the Uniform System (U.S.) of apertures was adopted as a standard by the Photographic Society of Great Britain in the 1880s. Bothamley in 1891 said "The stops of all the best makers are now arranged according to this system." U.S. 16 is the same aperture as f/16, but apertures that are larger or smaller by a full stop use doubling or halving of the U.S. number; for example f/11 is U.S. 8 and f/8 is U.S. 4. The exposure time required is directly proportional to the U.S. number. Eastman Kodak used U.S. stops on many of their cameras at least in the 1920s.

By 1895, Hodges contradicts Bothamley, saying that the f-number system has taken over: "This is called the f/x system, and the diaphragms of all modern lenses of good construction are so marked."

Here is the situation as seen in 1899:

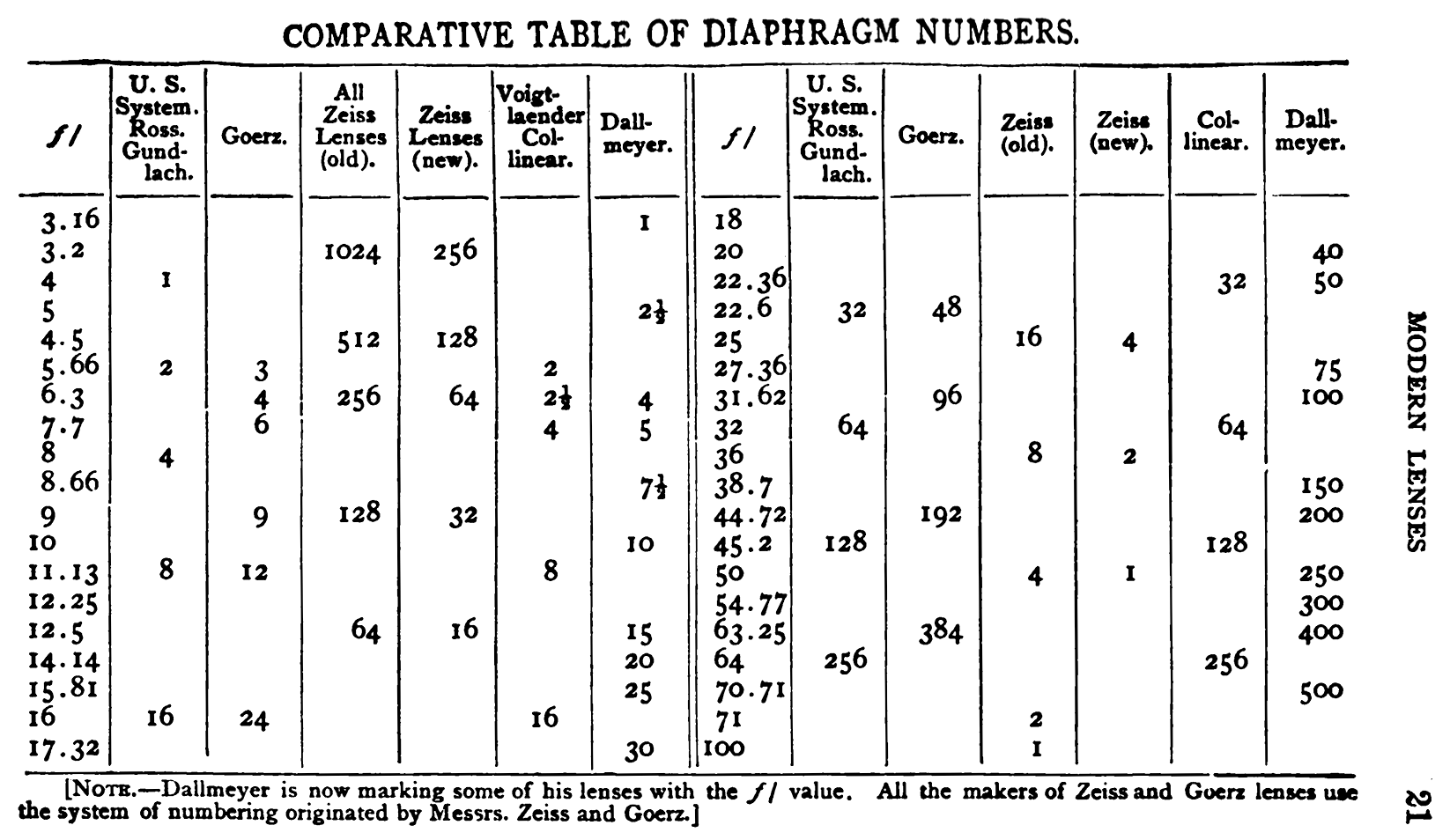

Piper in 1901 discusses five different systems of aperture marking: the old and new Zeiss systems based on actual intensity (proportional to reciprocal square of the f-number); and the U.S., Continental or International System (C.I.), and the Dallmeyer system, based on exposure (proportional to square of the f-number). He calls the f-number the "ratio number", "aperture ratio number", and "ratio aperture". He calls expressions like f/8 the "fractional diameter" of the aperture.

Beck and Andrews in 1902 talk about the Royal Photographic Society standard of f/4, f/5.6, f/8, f/11.3, etc. The Royal Photographic Society had changed their name and moved off of the Uniform System some time between 1895 and 1902.

=== Typographical standardization ===
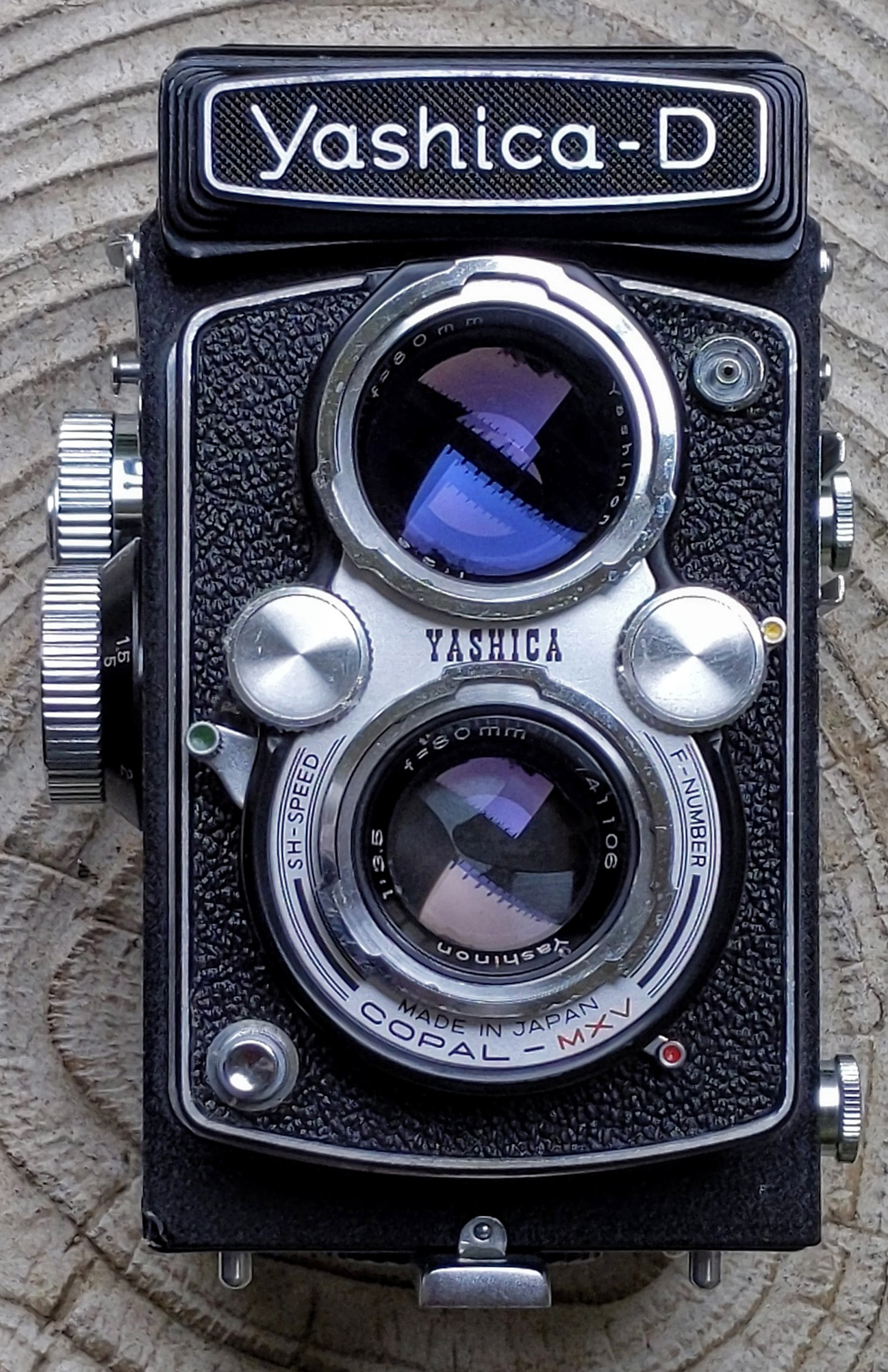
Yashica-D TLR camera front view. This is one of the few cameras that actually says "F-NUMBER" on it.

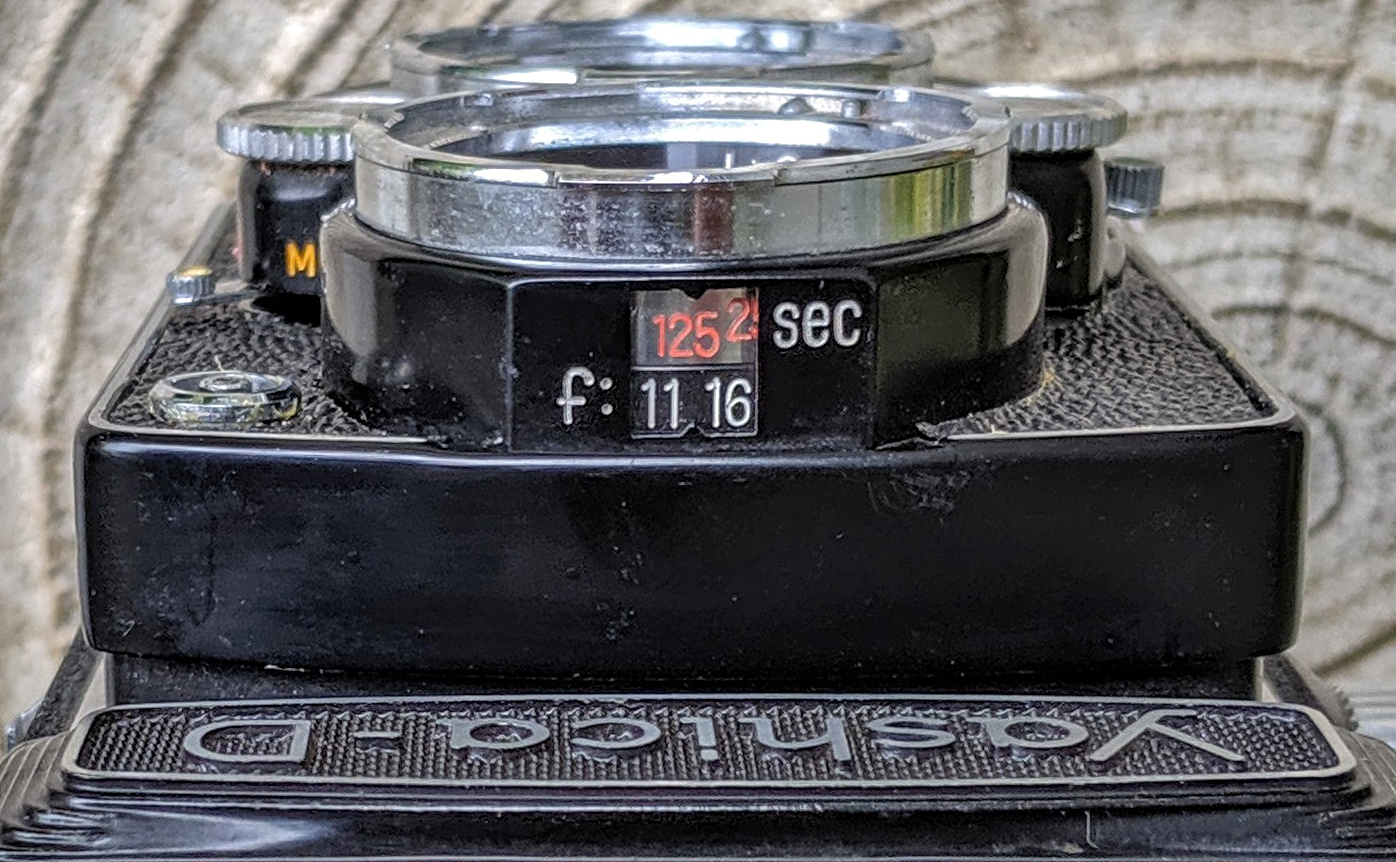
From the top, the Yashica-D's aperture setting window uses the "f:" notation. The aperture is continuously variable with no "stops".

By 1920, the term f-number appeared in books both as F number and f/number. In modern publications, the forms f-number and f number are more common, though the earlier forms, as well as F-number are still found in a few books; not uncommonly, the initial lower-case f in f-number or f/number is set in a hooked italic form: ƒ.

Notations for f-numbers were also quite variable in the early part of the twentieth century. They were sometimes written with a capital F, sometimes with a dot (period) instead of a slash, and sometimes set as a vertical fraction.

The 1961 ASA standard PH2.12-1961 American Standard General-Purpose Photographic Exposure Meters (Photoelectric Type) specifies that "The symbol for relative apertures shall be ƒ/ or ƒ: followed by the effective ƒ-number." They show the hooked italic 'ƒ' not only in the symbol, but also in the term f-number, which today is more commonly set in an ordinary non-italic face.

== See also ==
- Circle of confusion
- Group f/64
- Photographic lens design
- Pinhole camera
- Preferred number
