= Exit pupil =

Virtual aperture in an optical system

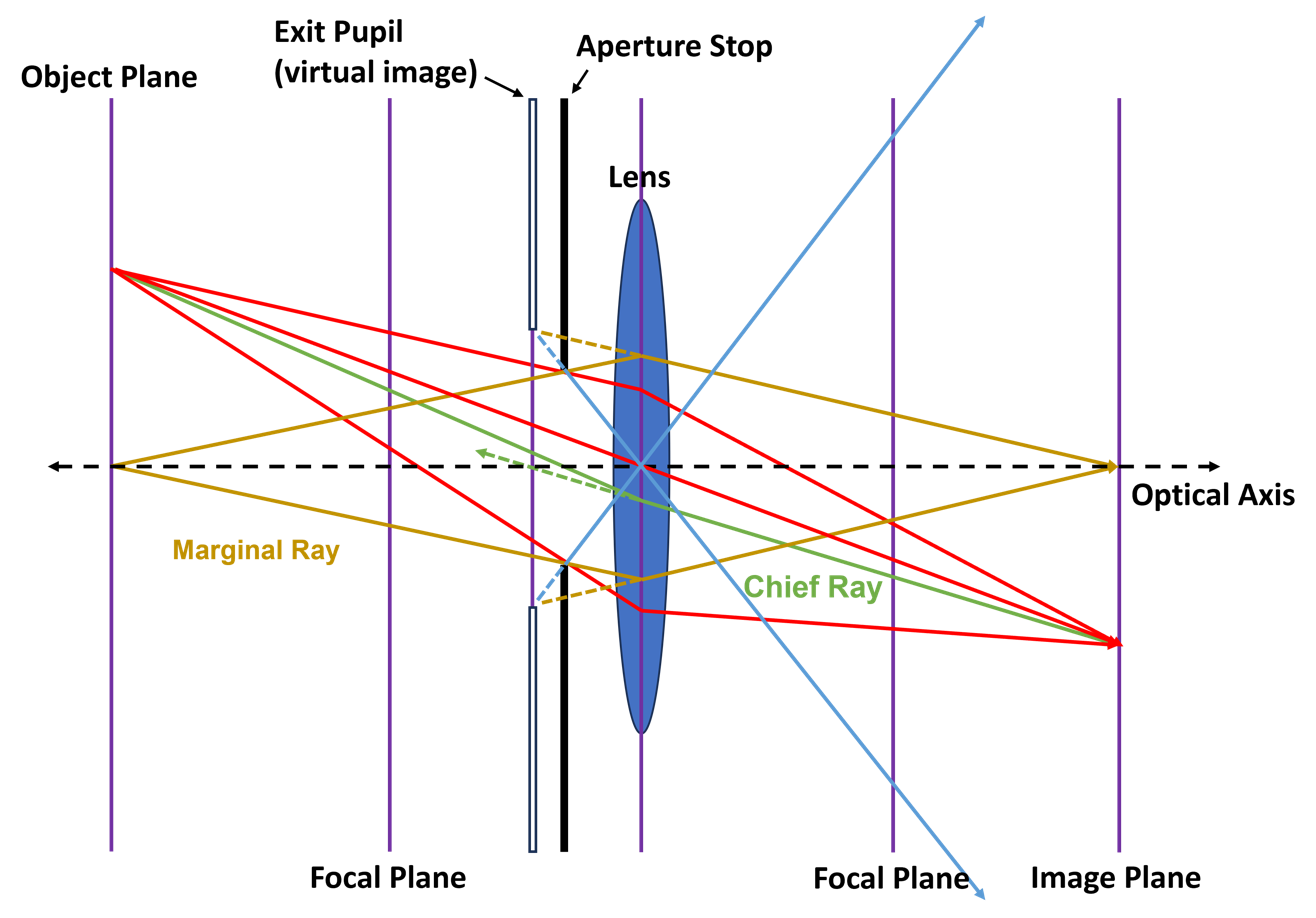
Single lens imaging with the aperture stop. The exit pupil is the image of the aperture stop formed by the optics behind it, and the location and size of the pupil are determined by chief rays and marginal rays. The exit pupil is a virtual image in this case.

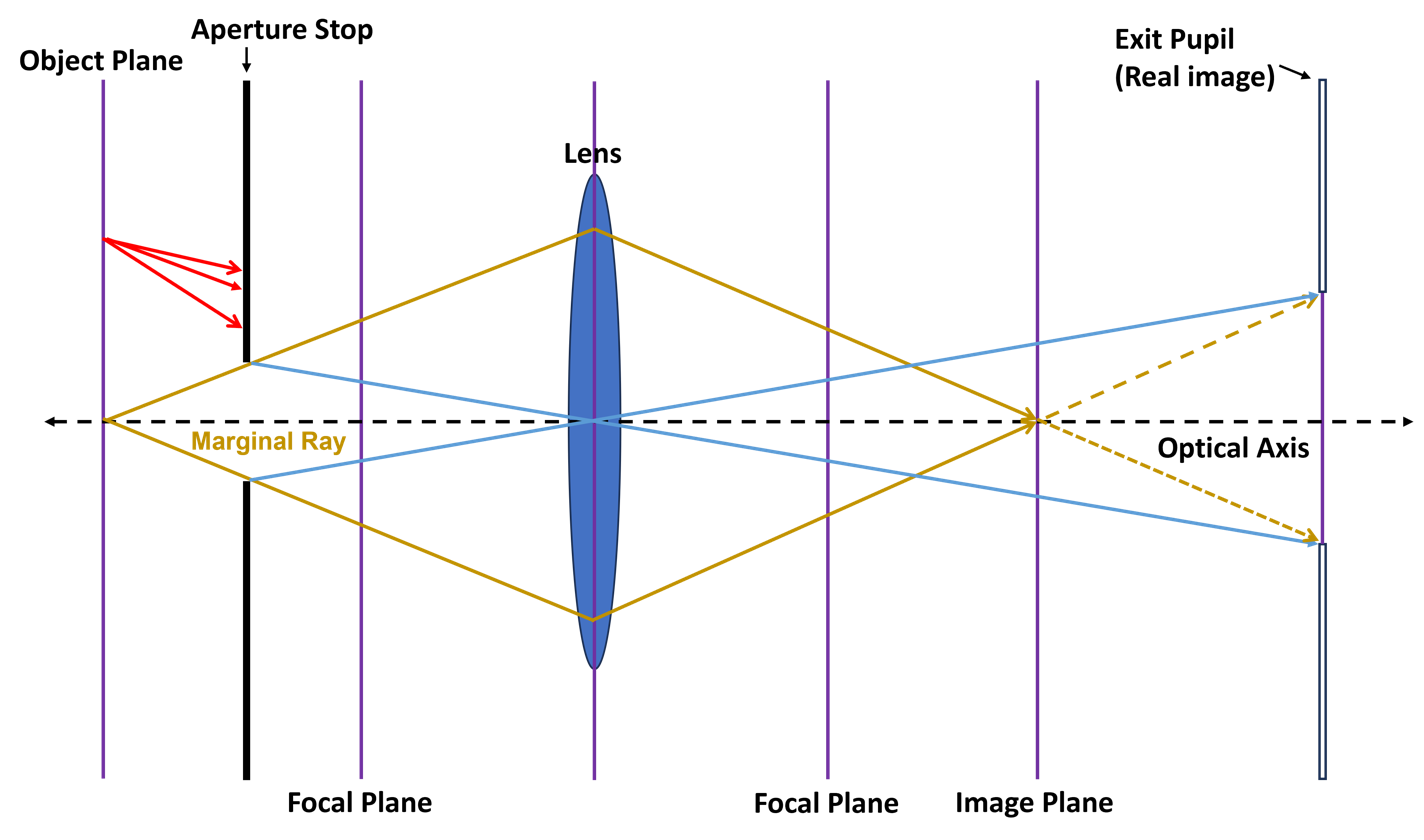
An example of a real-image exit pupil. Forward extension of marginal rays from the axial image point through the exit pupil determines the maximum cone of rays exiting the optical system.

In optics, the exit pupil of an optical system is the image (real or virtual) of the system's aperture stop created by the optics that follow it in the system. Only rays which pass through the exit pupil can leave the system. In a telescope or compound microscope, the exit pupil is the image of the objective element(s) as produced by the eyepiece. For such an image-enhancing instrument, the size and shape of the exit pupil are important because only light that passes through it can reach an observer's eye. The term exit pupil is also sometimes used to refer to the diameter of this pupil. Older literature on optics sometimes refers to the exit pupil as the Ramsden disc, named after English instrument-maker Jesse Ramsden.

== Visual instruments ==
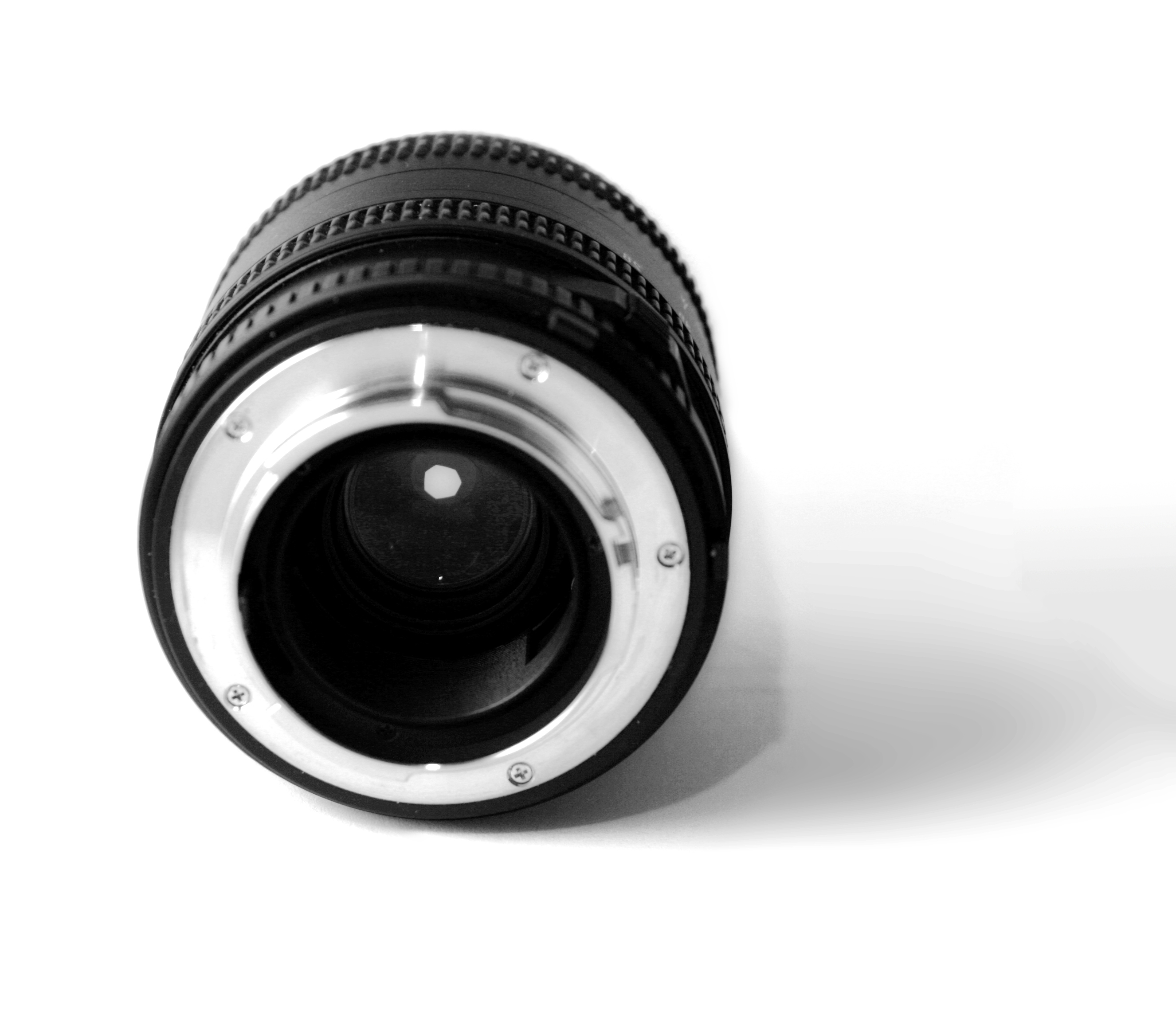
The image side of the lens of an SLR camera; the exit pupil is the light area in the middle of the lens.

The aperture of this optical system is the edge of the objective lens. The exit pupil is the image of the aperture made by the optics following it (here it is the eyepiece as the 2nd optics in the black housing); divergent rays from each point in the aperture plane come together again in the exit pupil.

To use an image-enhancing optical instrument (e.g., telescopes, microscopes, and binoculars), the entrance pupil of the viewer's eye (the image of the anatomical pupil as seen through the cornea) must be aligned with and be of similar size to the instrument's exit pupil. This configuration will properly couple the optical system to the eye. Putting the eye's entrance pupil at the same place of the exit pupil avoids vignetting because the eye captures all of the chief rays exiting the instrument. The location of the exit pupil thus determines the eye relief of an eyepiece. Good eyepiece designs produce an exit pupil of diameter approximating the eye's apparent pupil diameter and located about 20 mm away from the last surface of the eyepiece for the viewer's comfort. If the disc is larger than the eye's pupil, then light will be lost instead of entering the eye. If the disc is too close to the last surface of the eyepiece, then the eye will have to be uncomfortably close for viewing; if too far away, then the observer will have difficulty maintaining the eye's alignment with the disc because there is no instrumental help to physically hold the eye position.

Average human eye pupil diameter vs. age
Age (years)	Day (mm)	Night (mm)
20	4.7	7.3
30	4.3	6.6
40	3.9	6.2
50	3.5	5.8
60	3.1	5.6
70	2.7	5.2
80	2.3	4.9

Since the eye's pupil varies in diameter with viewing conditions, the ideal exit pupil diameter depends on the application. An astronomical telescope requires a large exit pupil because it is designed to be used for looking at dim objects at night, while a microscope will require a much smaller exit pupil since an object being observed will be brightly illuminated. A set of 7×50 binoculars has an exit pupil just over 7.14 mm, which corresponds to the average pupil size of a youthful dark-adapted human eye in circumstances with no extraneous light. The emergent light at the eyepiece then fills the eye's pupil, meaning no loss of brightness at night due to using such binoculars (assuming perfect transmission). In daylight, when the eye's pupil is only 4 mm in diameter, over half the light will be blocked by the iris and will not reach the retina. However, the loss of light in the daytime is generally not a concern since there is so much light to start with. By contrast, 8×30 binoculars, often sold with emphasis on their compactness, have an exit pupil of only 3.75 mm. That is sufficient to fill a typical daytime eye pupil, making these binoculars better suited to daytime than night-time use. The maximum pupil size of a human eye is typically 5–9 mm for individuals below 25 years old and decreases slowly with age as shown as an approximate guide in the table here.

The optimum eye relief distance also varies with application. For example, a rifle scope needs a very long eye relief to prevent recoil from causing it to strike the observer.

The exit pupil can be visualized by focusing the instrument on a bright, nondescript field, and holding a white card up to the eyepiece. This projects a disc of light onto the card. By moving the card closer to or further away from the eyepiece, the disc of light will be minimized when the card is at the exit pupil, and the bright disc then shows the diameter of the pupil. A clear vial of milky fluid can be used to scatter light rays exiting the eyepiece, making their paths visible. These rays appear as an hourglass shape converging and diverging as they exit the eyepiece, with the smallest cross-section (the waist of the hourglass shape) representing the exit pupil.

== Telescopes ==
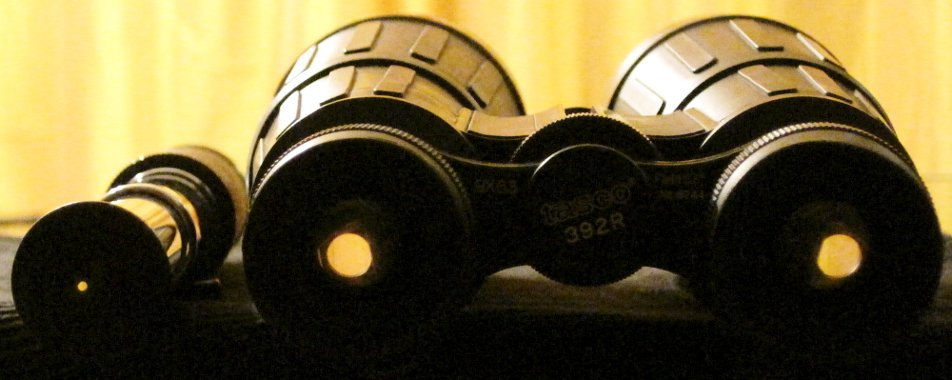
The small exit pupil of a 25×30 telescope and large exit pupils of 9×63 binoculars suitable for use in low light

For a telescope, the diameter of the exit pupil can be calculated by dividing the focal length of the eyepiece by the focal ratio (f-number) of the telescope. In all but the cheapest telescopes, the eyepieces are interchangeable, and for this reason, the magnification is not written on the scope, as it will change with different eyepieces. Instead, the f-number f = L / D of the telescope is typically written on the scope, as well as the objective diameter D and focal length L. The individual eyepieces have their focal lengths written on them as well.

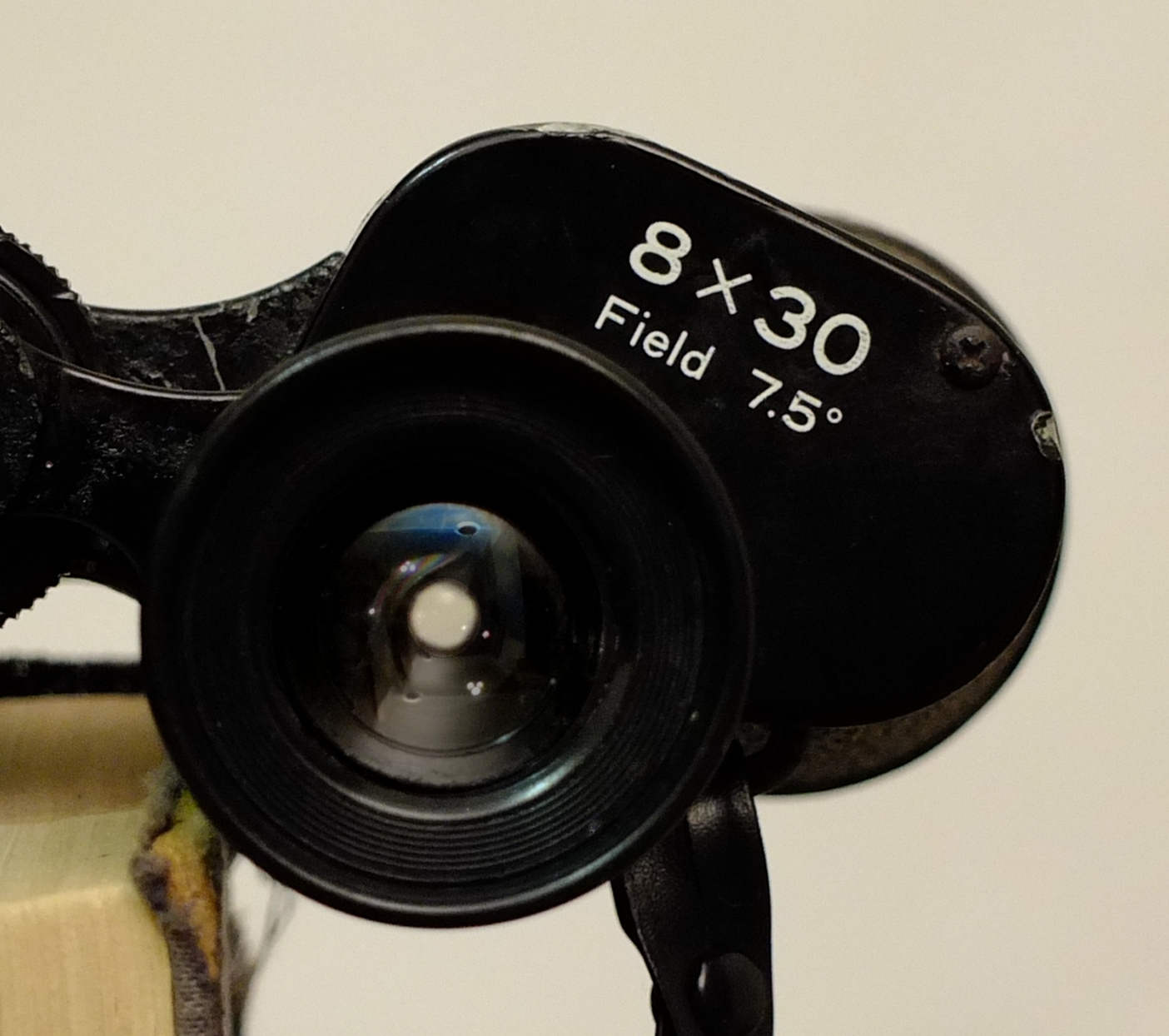
The exit pupil appears as a white disc on the eyepiece lens of these 8×30 binoculars. Its diameter is 30 ÷ 8 = 3.75 mm.

In the case of binoculars however, the two eyepieces are usually permanently attached, and the magnification and objective diameter (in mm) is typically written on the binoculars in the form, e.g., 7×50. In that case, the exit pupil can be easily calculated as the diameter of the objective lens divided by the magnification. The two formulas are of course equivalent and it is simply a matter of which information one starts with as to which formula to use.

== Photography ==
The distance of the exit pupil from the sensor plane determines the range of angles of incidence that light will make with the sensor. Digital image sensors often have a limited range of angles over which they will efficiently accept light, especially those that use microlenses to increase their sensitivity. The closer the exit pupil to the focal plane, the higher the angles of incidence at the extreme edges of the field. This can lead to pixel vignetting. For this reason, many small digital cameras (such as those found in cell phones) are image-space telecentric, so that the chief rays strike the image sensor at normal incidence.

== See also ==
- Transmittance
- Diaphragm (optics)
- Pupil magnification

== Bibliography ==
- Greivenkamp, John E. (2004). Field Guide to Geometrical Optics. SPIE Field Guides vol. FG01. SPIE. ISBN 0-8194-5294-7.
- Hecht, Eugene (1987). Optics (2nd ed.). Addison Wesley. ISBN 0-201-11609-X.
