= Pupil magnification =

The pupil magnification of an optical system is the ratio of the diameter of the exit pupil to the diameter of the entrance pupil. The pupil magnification is used in calculations of the effective f-number, which affects a number of important elements related to optics, such as exposure, diffraction, and depth of field. For all symmetric lenses (for a compound lens, it is a lens where optics on both sides, object and image sides, with respect to an aperture stop, are same in optical performance), and for many conventional photographic lenses, the pupils appear the same size and so the pupil magnification is approximately 1.

== See also ==
- Magnification
