= Entrance pupil =

Optical image of the physical aperture stop

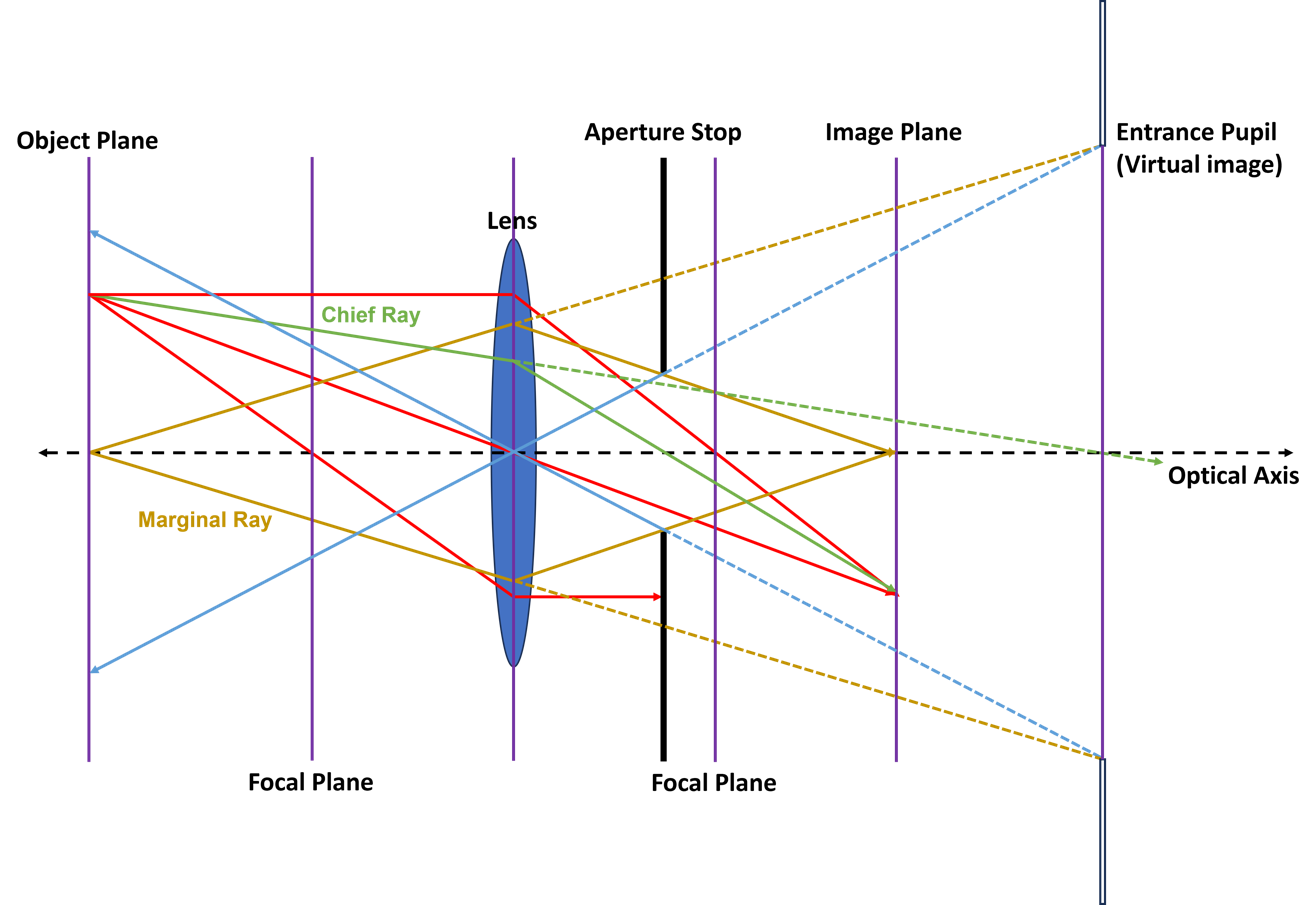
The entrance pupil made by a single lens with an aperture (aperture stop) behind it. The entrance pupil is the image of the aperture stop viewed from the front of the optical system and here it is a virtual image. Chief rays and marginal rays determine the location and the size of the entrance pupil, respectively.

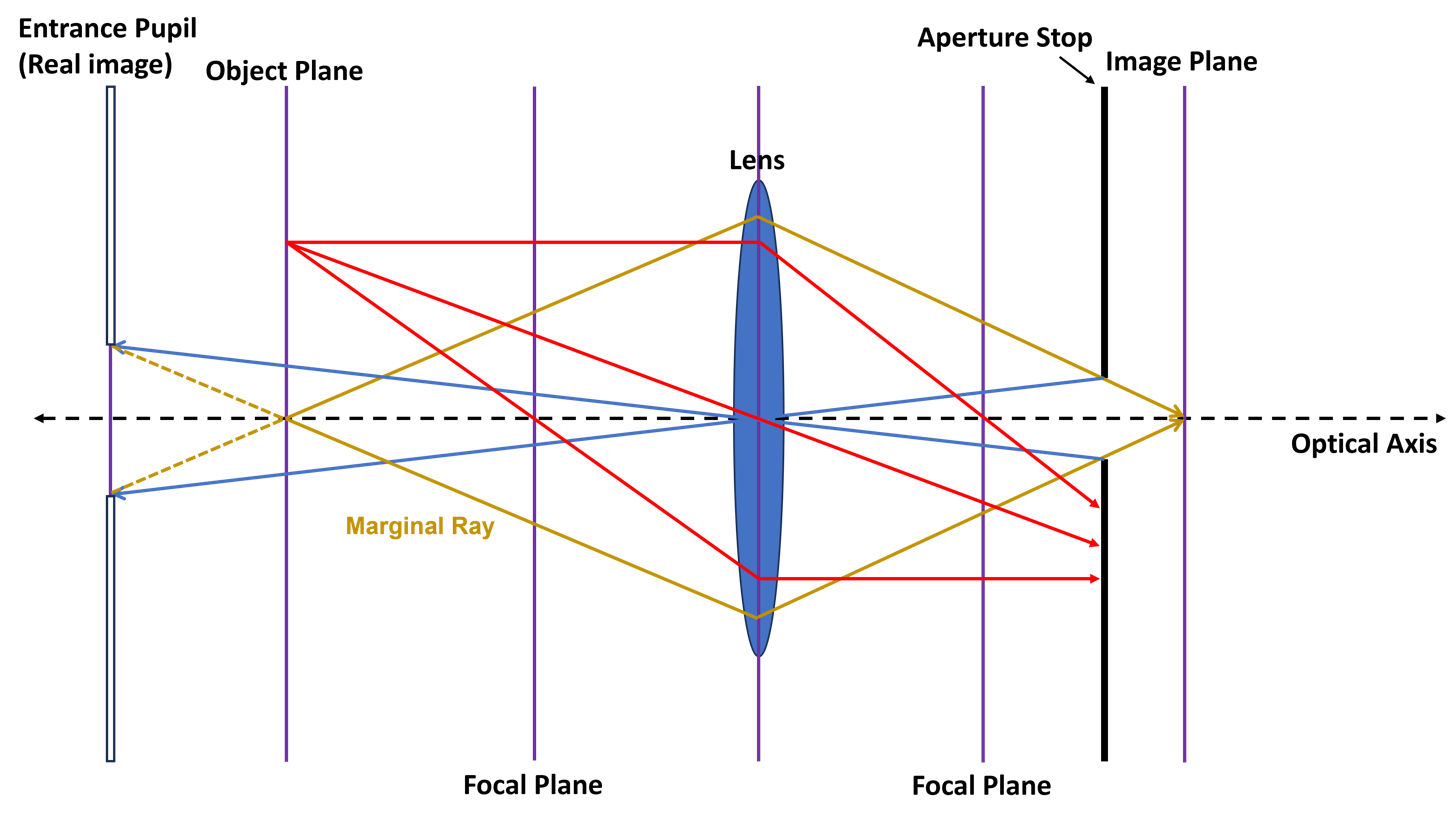
An example of real image entrance pupils, made by a single thin lens and an aperture located beyond the BFL (Back Focal Length) of the lens. The entrance pupil and back-extension of the marginal rays determine the maximum cone of rays (from the on-axis object point) accepted by this optical system.

In an optical system (generally a lens), the entrance pupil is the optical image of the physical aperture, as 'seen' through the optical elements in front of the stop. The corresponding image of the aperture stop as seen through the optical elements behind it is called the exit pupil. The entrance pupil defines the cone of rays that can enter and pass through the optical system. Rays that fall outside of the entrance pupil will not pass through the system. (Note: In the reference "Hecht, Eugene (2017). "5.3.2 Entrance and Exit Pupils". Optics (5th ed.). Pearson. ISBN 978-1-292-09693-3." the pupil are defined by images of the aperture stop as seen from axial points. By this definition, the aperture stop and the pupils are for axial cones of rays.)

If there is no lens in front of the aperture (as in a pinhole camera), the entrance pupil's location and size are identical to those of the aperture. Optical elements in front of the aperture will produce a magnified or diminished image of the aperture that is displaced from the aperture location. The entrance pupil is usually a virtual image: it lies behind the first optical surface of the system.

The entrance pupil is a useful concept for determining the size of the cone of rays that an optical system will accept. Once the size and the location of the entrance pupil of an optical system is determined, the maximum cone of rays that the system will accept from a given object plane is determined solely by the size of the entrance pupil and its distance from the object plane, without any need to consider ray refraction by the optics.

In photography, the size of the entrance pupil (rather than the size of the physical aperture stop) is used to calibrate the opening and closing of the diaphragm aperture. The f-number (also called the 'relative aperture'), N, is defined by N = f / E_{N}, where f is the focal length and E_{N} is the diameter of the entrance pupil. Increasing the focal length of a lens (i.e., zooming in) will usually cause the f-number to increase, and the entrance pupil location to move further back along the optical axis.

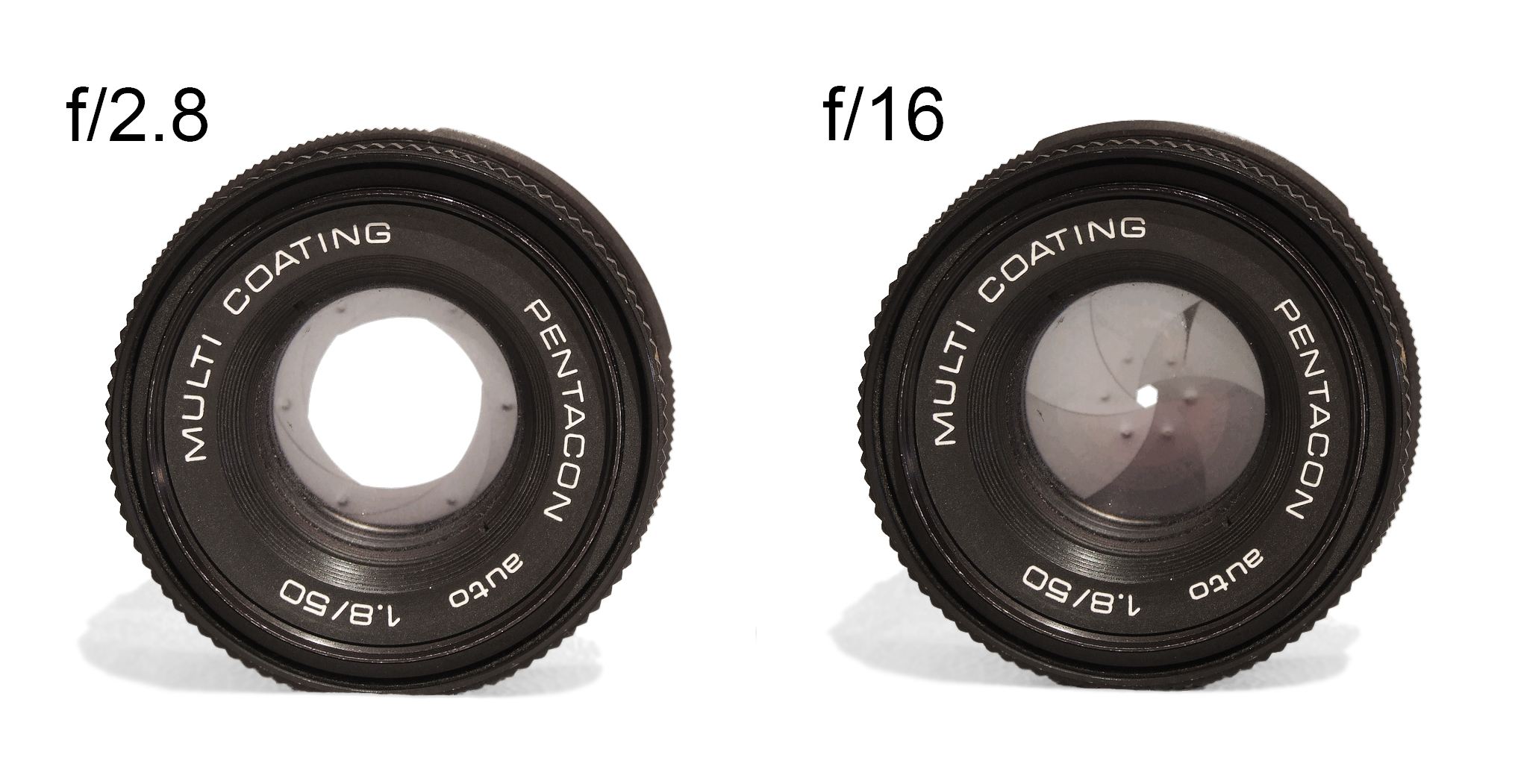
A camera lens adjusted for large and small aperture. The visible opening is the entrance pupil of the lens.

The center of the entrance pupil is the vertex of a camera's angle of view as chief rays cross this point. Consequently, this point is the camera's center of perspective, perspective point, viewpoint, projection center, or no-parallax point. This point is important in panoramic photography without digital image processing, because the camera must be rotated around the center of the entrance pupil to avoid parallax errors in the final, stitched panorama. Panoramic photographers often incorrectly refer to the entrance pupil as a nodal point, which is a different concept. Depending on the lens design, the entrance pupil location on the optical axis may be behind, within or in front of the lens system; and even at infinite distance from the lens in the case of telecentric lenses. The entrance pupil of the human eye, which is not quite the same as the physical pupil, is typically about 4 mm in diameter. It can range from 2 mm (f/8.3) in a very brightly lit place to 8 mm (f/2.1) in the dark.

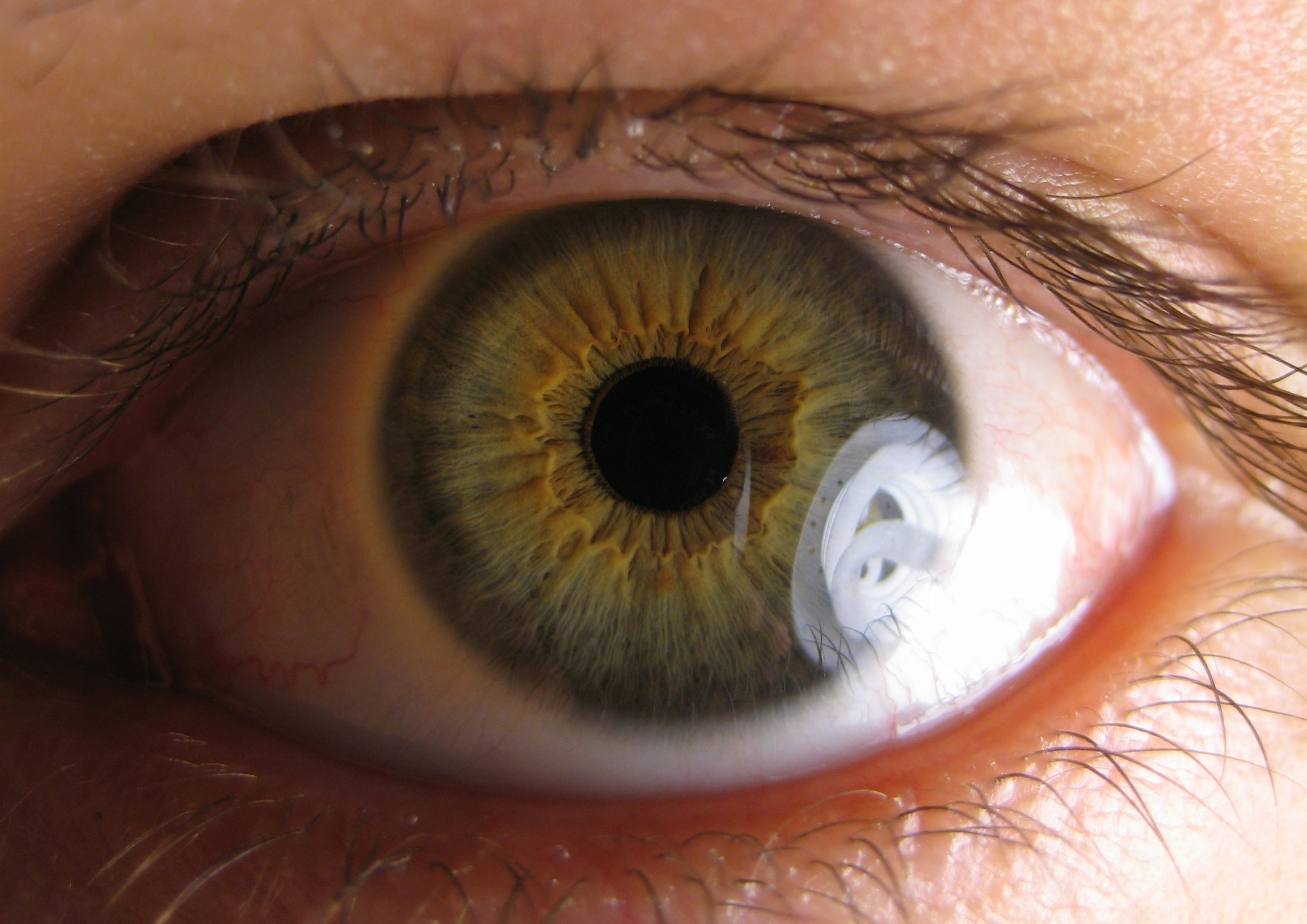
The apparent location of the anatomical pupil of a human eye (black circle) is the eye's entrance pupil location. The outside world appears to be seen from the point at the center of the entrance pupil. The anatomical pupil itself is slightly different from the entrance pupil because the image is magnified by the cornea.

An optical system is typically designed with a single aperture stop and therefore has a single entrance pupil at designed working conditions. It is possible, however, for a different aperture to function as the aperture stop for objects at certain distances, which means that a system may have different entrance pupils for different object planes. Even within a single object plane, rays from off-axis object points may be blocked even though they pass through the system's aperture stop. This is called vignetting. (Note: Camera lenses are typically designed to minimize vignetting. Some optical systems are designed instead to guarantee high quality in a certain field of view within a certain range of working distances, and may allow vignetting for objects outside the intended field of view.) It can be described as an effective aperture stop for each off-axis object point. These effective aperture stops are generally not located at any of the system's physical apertures.

== See also ==
- Exit pupil
- Pupil magnification
- Transmittance
