= Acceptance angle =

Acceptance angle may refer to:

- Half of the angular aperture of an optical system
- Acceptance angle (optical fiber), the angle in an optical fiber below which rays are guided rays
- Acceptance angle (solar concentrator)

== See also ==
- Numerical aperture
