= Herschel's condition =

Optical system example

Entrance and exit rays through an imaging system (grey box).

In optics, the Herschel's condition is a condition for an optical system to produce sharp images for objects over an extended axial range, i.e. for objects displaced along the optical axis. It was formulated by John Herschel.

== Mathematical formulation ==
The Herschel's condition in mathematical form is
$$\frac{1-\cos \alpha_\mathrm{o}}{1-\cos \alpha_\mathrm{i}} = \frac{1-\cos \beta_\mathrm{o}}{1-\cos \beta_\mathrm{i}} = \frac{n_i^2}{n_o^2}|M_T|^2$$
where $\alpha_o,\beta_o$ are the object side ray angles, $\alpha_i,\beta_i$ are the image side ray angle. $n_o,n_i$ are the object and image side refractive index, and $M_T$ is the transverse magnification. This condition can be derived by the Fermat's principle.

This condition can also be expressed as
$$M_L = \frac{n_o\sin^2 (\alpha_\mathrm{o}/2)}{n_i\sin^2 (\alpha_\mathrm{i}/2)}=\frac{n_o(1-\cos \alpha_\mathrm{o})}{n_i(1-\cos \alpha_\mathrm{i})} \text{ and } M_T = \frac{n_o\sin (\alpha_\mathrm{o}/2)}{n_i\sin (\alpha_\mathrm{i}/2)}$$
where $M_L = \frac{n_i}{n_o}M_T^2$ is the longitudinal magnification.

This condition is in general conflict with the Abbe sine condition, which is the condition for aberration free imaging for objects displaced off-axis. They can be simultaneously satisfied only when the system has magnification equal to the ratio of refractive index $|M_T|=n_o/n_i$.

== See also ==
- Lagrange invariant
- Smith-Helmholtz invariant
- Abbe sine condition
