= LNA =

LNA may refer to:

== Music ==
- Late Night Alumni, a US house group

== Organizations ==
- Libyan National Army
- Ladies National Association

== Places ==
- Lantana Airport (Florida)
- Lenteng Agung railway station, Jakarta, Indonesia

== Products ==
- Citroën LNA, a Citroën car

== Science and technology ==
- Linolenic acid
- Locked nucleic acid
- Low-noise amplifier
- Launch numerical aperture

== Trade ==
- Licencias no automáticas previas de importación, Argentine non-automatic import license, prior to importation
