= View factor =

Proportion in thermal radiation

Intensity of thermal radiation from the sun depends on view factor

In radiative heat transfer, a view factor, $F_{A \rarr B}$, is the proportion of the radiation which leaves surface $A$ that strikes surface $B$. In a complex 'scene' there can be any number of different objects, which can be divided in turn into even more surfaces and surface segments.

View factors are also sometimes known as configuration factors, form factors, angle factors or shape factors.

== Relations ==
=== Summation ===
Radiation leaving a surface within an enclosure is conserved. Because of this, the sum of all view factors from a given surface, $S_i$, within the enclosure is unity as defined by the summation rule

$$\sum_{j=1}^n {F_{S_i \rarr S_j}} = 1$$

where $n$ is the number of surfaces in the enclosure. Any enclosure with $n$ surfaces has a total $n^2$ view factors.

For example, consider a case where two blobs with surfaces A and B are floating around in a cavity with surface C. All of the radiation that leaves A must either hit B or C, or if A is concave, it could hit A. 100% of the radiation leaving A is divided up among A, B, and C.

Confusion often arises when considering the radiation that arrives at a target surface. In that case, it generally does not make sense to sum view factors as view factor from A and view factor from B (above) are essentially different units. C may see 10% of A's radiation and 50% of B's radiation and 20% of C's radiation, but without knowing how much each radiates, it does not even make sense to say that C receives 80% of the total radiation.

=== Reciprocity ===
The reciprocity relation for view factors allows one to calculate $F_{i \rarr j}$ if one already knows $F_{j \rarr i}$ and is given as

$$A_i F_{i \rarr j} = A_j F_{j \rarr i}$$
where $A_i$ and $A_j$ are the areas of the two surfaces.

=== Self-viewing ===
For a convex surface, no radiation can leave the surface and then hit it later, because radiation travels in straight lines. Hence, for convex surfaces, $F_{i \rarr i} = 0.$

For concave surfaces, this doesn't apply, and so for concave surfaces $F_{i \rarr i} > 0.$

=== Superposition ===
The superposition rule (or summation rule) is useful when a certain geometry is not available with given charts or graphs. The superposition rule allows us to express the geometry that is being sought using the sum or difference of geometries that are known.
$$F_{1 \rarr (2,3)}=F_{1 \rarr 2}+F_{1\rarr 3}.$$

== View factors of differential areas ==
Two differential areas in arbitrary configuration

Taking the limit of a small flat surface gives differential areas, the view factor of two differential areas of areas $\hbox{d}A_1$ and $\hbox{d}A_2$ at a distance s is given by:

$$dF_{1 \rarr 2} = \frac{\cos\theta_1 \cos\theta_2}{\pi s^2}\hbox{d}A_2$$

where $\theta_1$ and $\theta_2$ are the angle between the surface normals and a ray between the two differential areas.

The view factor from a general surface $A_1$ to another general surface $A_2$ is given by:
$$F_{1 \rarr 2} = \frac{1}{A_1} \int_{A_1} \int_{A_2} \frac{\cos\theta_1 \cos\theta_2}{\pi s^2}\, \hbox{d}A_2\, \hbox{d}A_1.$$

Similarly the view factor $F_{2\rightarrow 1}$ is defined as the fraction of radiation that leaves $A_2$ and is intercepted by $A_1$, yielding the equation
$$F_{2 \rarr 1} = \frac{1}{A_2} \int_{A_1} \int_{A_2} \frac{\cos\theta_1 \cos\theta_2}{\pi s^2}\, \hbox{d}A_2\, \hbox{d}A_1.$$

The view factor is related to the concept of etendue.

== Example solutions ==
For complex geometries, the view factor integral equation defined above can be cumbersome to solve. Solutions are often referenced from a table of theoretical geometries. Common solutions are included in the following table:

Table 1: View factors for common infinite geometries
Geometry	Relation
Parallel plates of widths, $w_i, w_j$ with midlines connected by perpendicular of length $L$	$$F_{ij}=\frac{[(W_i+W_j)^2+4]^{1/2}-[(W_j-W_i)^2+4]^{1/2}}{2W_i}$$ where $W_i=w_i/L,W_j=w_j/L$
Inclined parallel plates at angle, $\alpha$, of equal width, $w$, and a common edge	$$F_{ij}=1-sin(\frac{\alpha}{2})$$
Perpendicular plates of widths, $w_i, w_j$ with a common edge	$$F_{ij}=\frac{1+(w_j/w_i)-[1+(w_j/w_i)^2]^{1/2}}{2}$$
Three sided enclosure of widths, $w_i, w_j, w_k$	$$F_{ij}=\frac{w_i+w_j-w_k}{2w_i}$$

== Nusselt analog ==
Nusselt analog: the projected solid angle

A geometrical picture that can aid intuition about the view factor was developed by Wilhelm Nusselt, and is called the Nusselt analog. The view factor between a differential element dA_{i} and the element A_{j} can be obtained projecting the element A_{j} onto the surface of a unit hemisphere, and then projecting that in turn onto a unit circle around the point of interest in the plane of A_{i}. The view factor is then equal to the differential area dA_{i} times the proportion of the unit circle covered by this projection.

The projection onto the hemisphere, giving the solid angle subtended by A_{j}, takes care of the factors cos θ_{2} and 1/r^{2}; the projection onto the circle and the division by its area then takes care of the local factor cos θ_{1} and the normalisation by π.

The Nusselt analog has on occasion been used to actually measure form factors for complicated surfaces, by photographing them through a suitable fish-eye lens. But its main value now is essentially in building intuition.

== See also ==
- Radiosity, a matrix calculation method for solving radiation transfer between a number of bodies.
- Gebhart factor, an expression to solve radiation transfer problems between any number of surfaces.
