= Abbe sine condition =

Design rule for optical systems

The entrance and exit angles of each ray that passes through an imaging system (grey box) are related. When the imaging system obeys the Abbe sine condition, the ratio of the sines of these angles equal the (lateral absolute) magnification of the system.

In optics, the Abbe sine condition is a condition that must be fulfilled by a lens or other optical system in order for it to produce sharp images of off-axis as well as on-axis objects. It was formulated by Ernst Abbe in the context of microscopes.

The Abbe sine condition says that

the sine of the object-space angle $\alpha_\mathrm{o}$ should be proportional to the sine of the image space angle $\alpha_\mathrm{i}$

Furthermore, the ratio equals the magnification of the system multiplied by the ratio of refractive indices. In mathematical terms this is:
$$\frac{\sin \alpha_\mathrm{o}}{\sin \alpha_\mathrm{i}} = \frac{\sin \beta_\mathrm{o}}{\sin \beta_\mathrm{i}} = \frac{n_i}{n_o}|M|$$

where the variables $(\alpha_\mathrm{o}, \beta_\mathrm{o})$ are the angles (relative to the optic axis) of any two rays as they leave the object, and $(\alpha_\mathrm{i}, \beta_\mathrm{i})$ are the angles of the same rays where they reach the image plane (say, the film plane of a camera). For example, ($\alpha_\mathrm{o}, \alpha_\mathrm{i})$ might represent a paraxial ray (i.e., a ray nearly parallel with the optic axis), and $(\beta_\mathrm{o}, \beta_\mathrm{i})$ might represent a marginal ray (i.e., a ray with the largest angle admitted by the system aperture). An optical imaging system for which this is true in for all rays is said to obey the Abbe sine condition.

The Abbe sine condition can be derived by Fermat's principle.

A thin lens satisfies
$$\frac{\tan \alpha_\mathrm{o}}{\tan \alpha_\mathrm{i}} = \frac{\tan \beta_\mathrm{o}}{\tan \beta_\mathrm{i}} = \frac{n_i}{n_o}|M|$$
instead, which means that it does not satisfy Abbe sine condition at large angles. The difference is on the order of $\alpha_o^3$, which corresponds to the coma aberration.

== Magnification and the Abbe sine condition ==
An optical imaging system (gray box) that obeys the sine condition has a fixed ratio between the sines of the ray angles at the entrance and exit of the system, sin(α_{o}) / sin(α_{i}), that equals the magnification M.

Using the framework of Fourier optics, we may easily explain the significance of the Abbe sine condition. Say an object in the object plane of an optical system has a transmittance function of the form, T(x_{o},y_{o}). We may express this transmittance function in terms of its Fourier transform as

$$T(x_\mathrm{o},y_\mathrm{o}) = \iint T(k_x,k_y) \exp\left({j(k_x x_\mathrm{o} + k_y y_\mathrm{o})}\right) \,dk_x\,dk_y\,,$$

where $\exp(z) = e^z$ is the exponential function, and $j = \sqrt{-1}$ is the imaginary unit.

Now, assume for simplicity that the system has no image distortion, so that the image plane coordinates are linearly related to the object plane coordinates via the relation

$$\begin{align}
x_\mathrm{i} &= M x_\mathrm{o} \\
y_\mathrm{i} &= M y_\mathrm{o} \,,
\end{align}$$

where M is the system magnification. The object plane transmittance above can now be re-written in a slightly modified form:

$$T(x_\mathrm{o},y_\mathrm{o}) = \iint T(k_x,k_y) \exp\left({j\left({k_x\over M} Mx_\mathrm{o} + {k_y\over M} My_\mathrm{o}\right)}\right) \,dk_x\,dk_y$$

where the various terms have been simply multiplied and divided in the exponent by M, the system magnification. Now, the equations may be substituted above for image plane coordinates in terms of object plane coordinates, to obtain,

$$T(x_\mathrm{i},y_\mathrm{i}) = \iint T(k_x,k_y) \exp\left({j\left({k_x\over M} x_\mathrm{i} + {k_y\over M} y_\mathrm{i}\right)}\right) \,dk_x\,dk_y\,.$$

At this point another coordinate transformation can be proposed (i.e., the Abbe sine condition) relating the object plane wavenumber spectrum to the image plane wavenumber spectrum as

$$\begin{align}
k^\mathrm{i}_x &= \frac{k_x}{M} \\
k^\mathrm{i}_y &= \frac{k_y}{M}
\end{align}$$

to obtain the final equation for the image plane field in terms of image plane coordinates and image plane wavenumbers as:

$$T(x_\mathrm{i},y_\mathrm{i}) = M^2 \iint T\left(M k^\mathrm{i}_x, M k^\mathrm{i}_y\right) \exp\left({j\left(k^\mathrm{i}_x x_\mathrm{i} + k^\mathrm{i}_y y_\mathrm{i}\right)}\right) \,dk^\mathrm{i}_x \,dk^\mathrm{i}_y$$

From Fourier optics, it is known that the wavenumbers can be expressed in terms of the spherical coordinate system as

$$\begin{align}
k_x &= k \sin \theta \cos \varphi \\
k_y &= k \sin \theta \sin \varphi \,.
\end{align}$$

If a spectral component is considered for which $\varphi =0$, then the coordinate transformation between object and image plane wavenumbers takes the form

$$k^\mathrm{i} \sin \theta^\mathrm{i} = k \frac{\sin \theta}{M}\,.$$

This is another way of writing the Abbe sine condition, which simply reflects the classical uncertainty principle for Fourier transform pairs, namely that as the spatial extent of any function is expanded (by the magnification factor, M), the spectral extent contracts by the same factor, M, so that the space-bandwidth product remains constant.

== See also ==
- Lagrange invariant
- Smith-Helmholtz invariant
- Herschel's condition
