= Etendue =

Measure of the "spread" of light in an optical system

Conservation of etendue

Etendue or étendue (/ˌeɪtɒnˈduː/) is a property of light in an optical system, which characterizes how "spread out" the light is in area and angle. The term étendue comes from French, where it means "extent". Other names for etendue include acceptance, throughput, light grasp, light-gathering power, optical extent, and the AΩ product.

From the source point of view, etendue is the product of the area of the source A and the solid angle Ω that the system's entrance pupil subtends as seen from the source. Equivalently, from the system point of view, the etendue equals the area of the entrance pupil times the solid angle the source subtends as seen from the pupil. These definitions must be applied for infinitesimally small "elements" of area and solid angle, which must then be summed over both the source and the diaphragm as shown below. Etendue may be considered to be a volume in phase space.

Etendue never decreases in any optical system where optical power is conserved. A perfect optical system produces an image with the same etendue as the source. It is related to the beam parameter product (BPP) in Gaussian beam optics, the view factor or shape factor in radiometry and radiative transfer, the Lagrange invariant, and the optical invariant, all of which share the property of being constant in an ideal optical system. The radiance of an optical system is equal to the derivative of the radiant flux with respect to the etendue.

== Definition ==
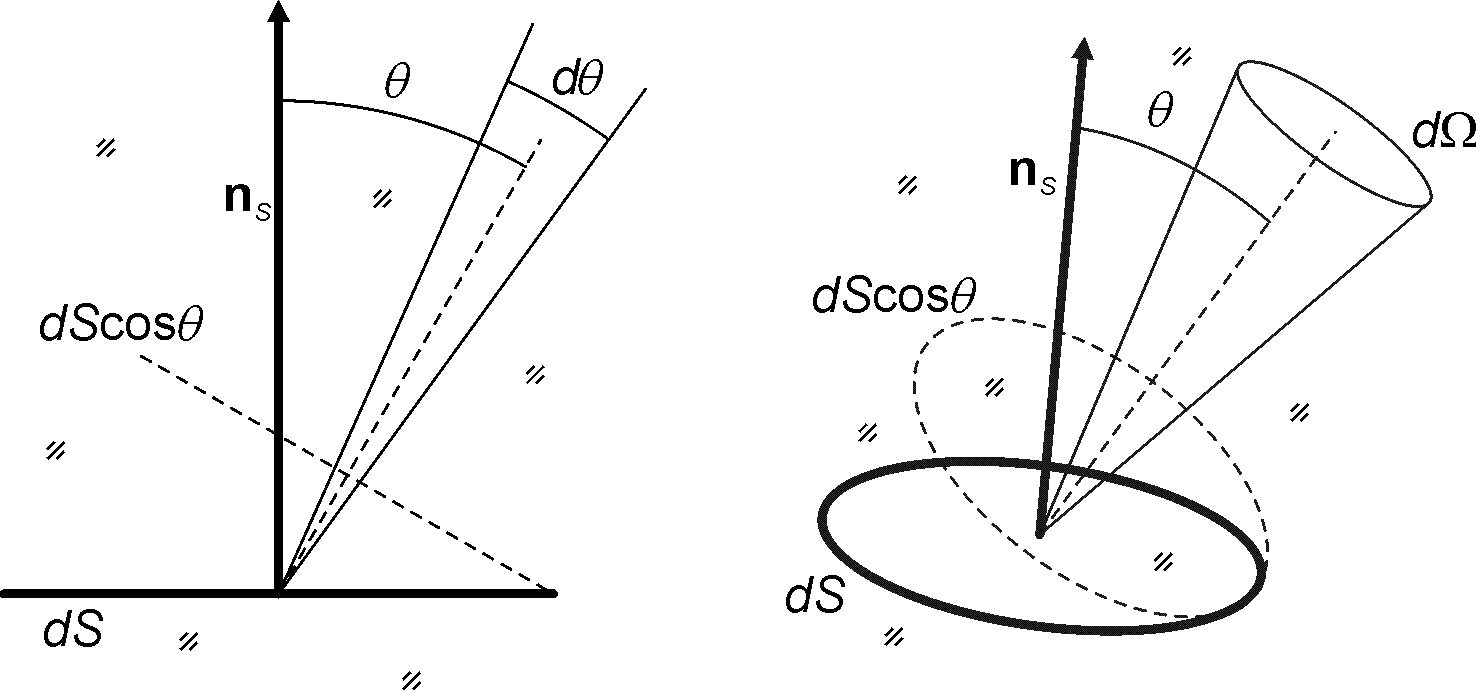
Etendue for a differential surface element in 2D (left) and 3D (right).

An infinitesimal surface element, dS, with normal n_{S} is immersed in a medium of refractive index n. The surface is crossed by (or emits) light confined to a solid angle, dΩ, at an angle θ with the normal n_{S}. The area of dS projected in the direction of the light propagation is dS cos θ. The etendue of an infinitesimal bundle of light crossing dS is defined as

$$\mathrm{d}G = n^2\, \mathrm{d}S \cos \theta\, \mathrm{d}\Omega\,.$$

Etendue is the product of geometric extent and the squared refractive index of a medium through which the beam propagates. Because angles, solid angles, and refractive indices are dimensionless quantities, etendue is often expressed in units of area (given by dS). However, it can alternatively be expressed in units of area (square meters) multiplied by solid angle (steradians).

=== In free space ===
Etendue in free space.

Consider a light source Σ, and a light detector S, both of which are extended surfaces (rather than differential elements), and which are separated by a medium of refractive index n that is perfectly transparent (shown). To compute the etendue of the system, one must consider the contribution of each point on the surface of the light source as they cast rays to each point on the receiver.

According to the definition above, the etendue of the light crossing dΣ towards dS is given by:

$$\mathrm{d}G_\Sigma = n^2\, \mathrm{d}\Sigma \cos \theta_\Sigma\, \mathrm{d}\Omega_\Sigma = n^2\, \mathrm{d}\Sigma \cos \theta_\Sigma \frac{\mathrm{d}S \cos \theta_S}{d^2}\,,$$

where dΩ_{Σ} is the solid angle defined by area dS at area dΣ, and d is the distance between the two areas. Similarly, the etendue of the light crossing dS coming from dΣ is given by:

$$\mathrm{d}G_S = n^2\, \mathrm{d}S \cos \theta_S\, \mathrm{d}\Omega_S = n^2\, \mathrm{d}S \cos \theta_S \frac{\mathrm{d}\Sigma \cos \theta_\Sigma}{d^2}\,,$$

where dΩ_{S} is the solid angle defined by area dΣ. These expressions result in

$$\mathrm{d}G_\Sigma = \mathrm{d}G_S\,,$$

showing that etendue is conserved as light propagates in free space.

The etendue of the whole system is then:

$$G = \int_\Sigma\!\int_S \mathrm{d}G\,.$$

If both surfaces dΣ and dS are immersed in air (or in vacuum), n = 1 and the expression above for the etendue may be written as

$$\mathrm{d}G = \mathrm{d}\Sigma\, \cos \theta_\Sigma\, \frac{\mathrm{d}S\, \cos \theta_S}{d^2} = \pi\, \mathrm{d}\Sigma\,\left(\frac{\cos \theta_\Sigma \cos \theta_S}{\pi d^2}\, \mathrm{d}S\right) = \pi\, \mathrm{d}\Sigma\, F_{\mathrm{d}\Sigma \rarr \mathrm{d}S}\,,$$

where F_{dΣ→dS} is the view factor between differential surfaces dΣ and dS. Integration on dΣ and dS results in G = πΣ F_{Σ→S} which allows the etendue between two surfaces to be obtained from the view factors between those surfaces.

== Conservation ==
The etendue of a given bundle of light is conserved: etendue can be increased, but not decreased in any optical system. This means that any system that concentrates light from some source onto a smaller area must always increase the solid angle of incidence (that is, the area of the sky that the source subtends). For example, a magnifying glass can increase the intensity of sunlight onto a small spot, but does so because, viewed from the spot that the light is concentrated onto, the apparent size of the sun is increased proportional to the concentration.

As shown below, etendue is conserved as light travels through free space and at refractions or reflections. It is then also conserved as light travels through optical systems where it undergoes perfect reflections or refractions. However, if light was to hit, say, a diffuser, its solid angle would increase, increasing the etendue. Etendue can then remain constant or it can increase as light propagates through an optic, but it cannot decrease. This is a direct result of the fact that entropy must be constant or increasing.

Conservation of etendue can be derived in different contexts, such as from optical first principles, from Hamiltonian optics or from the second law of thermodynamics.

From the perspective of thermodynamics, etendue is a form of entropy. Specifically, the etendue of a bundle of light contributes to the entropy of it by $S_{etendue} = k_B\ln \Omega$. Etendue may be exponentially decreased by an increase in entropy elsewhere. For example, a material might absorb photons and emit lower-frequency photons, and emit the difference in energy as heat. This increases entropy due to heat, allowing a corresponding decrease in etendue.

The conservation of etendue in free space is related to the reciprocity theorem for view factors.

=== In refractions and reflections ===
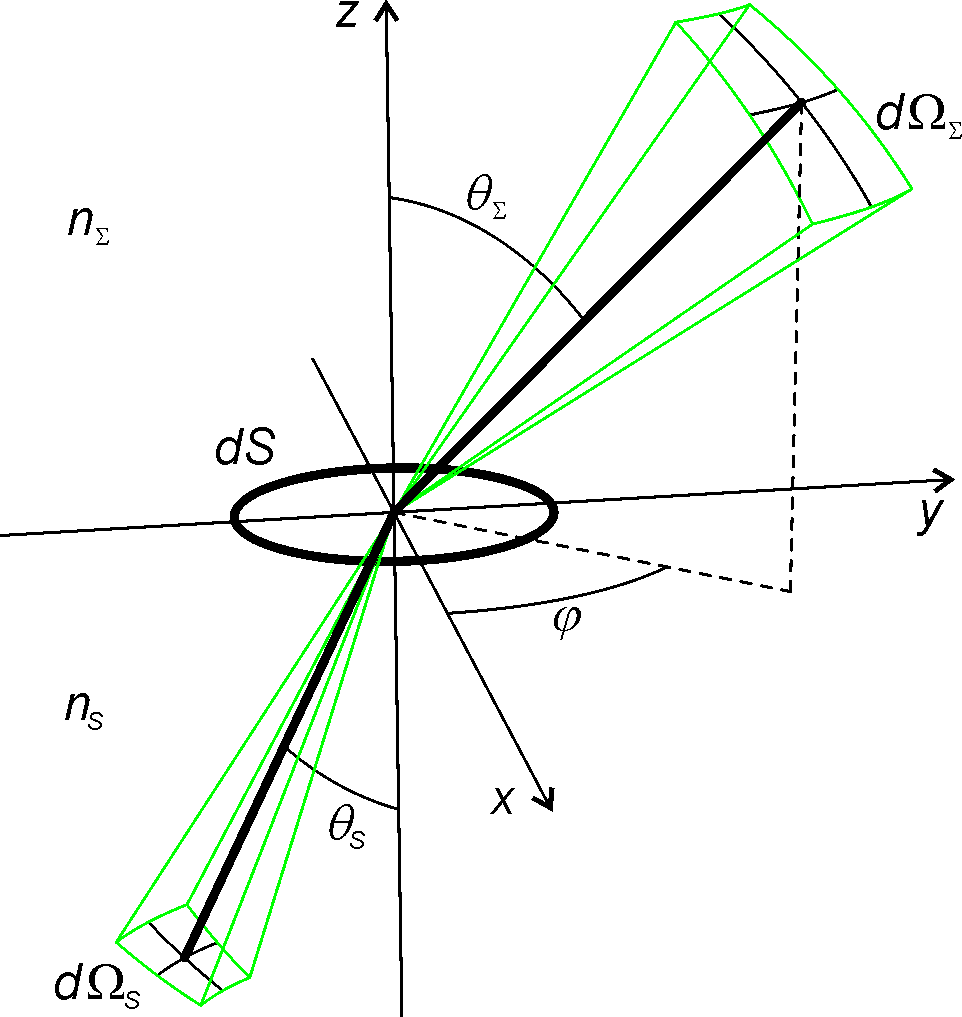
Etendue in refraction.

The conservation of etendue discussed above applies to the case of light propagation in free space, or more generally, in a medium of any refractive index. In particular, etendue is conserved in refractions and reflections. Figure "etendue in refraction" shows an infinitesimal surface dS on the x-y plane separating two media of refractive indices n_{Σ} and n_{S}.

The normal to dS points in the direction of the z-axis. Incoming light is confined to a solid angle dΩ_{Σ} and reaches dS at an angle θ_{Σ} to its normal. Refracted light is confined to a solid angle dΩ_{S} and leaves dS at an angle θ_{S} to its normal. The directions of the incoming and refracted light are contained in a plane making an angle φ to the x-axis, defining these directions in a spherical coordinate system. With these definitions, Snell's law of refraction can be written as

$$n_\Sigma \sin \theta_\Sigma = n_S \sin \theta_S\,,$$

and its derivative relative to θ

$$n_\Sigma \cos \theta_\Sigma\, \mathrm{d}\theta_\Sigma = n_S \cos \theta_S \mathrm{d}\theta_S\,,$$

multiplied by each other result in

$$n_\Sigma^2 \cos \theta_\Sigma\!\left(\sin \theta_\Sigma\, \mathrm{d}\theta_\Sigma\, \mathrm{d}\varphi\right) = n_S^2 \cos \theta_S\!\left(\sin \theta_S\, \mathrm{d}\theta_S\, \mathrm{d}\varphi\right)\,,$$

where both sides of the equation were also multiplied by dφ which does not change on refraction. This expression can now be written as

$$n_\Sigma^2 \cos \theta_\Sigma\, \mathrm{d}\Omega_\Sigma = n_S^2 \cos \theta_S\, \mathrm{d}\Omega_S\,.$$

Multiplying both sides by dS we get

$$n_\Sigma^2\, \mathrm{d}S \cos \theta_\Sigma\, \mathrm{d}\Omega_\Sigma = n_S^2\, \mathrm{d}S \cos \theta_S\, \mathrm{d}\Omega_S\,;$$

that is

$$\mathrm{d}G_\Sigma = \mathrm{d}G_S\,,$$

showing that the etendue of the light refracted at dS is conserved. The same result is also valid for the case of a reflection at a surface dS, in which case n_{Σ} = n_{S} and θ_{Σ} = θ_{S}.

=== Brightness theorem ===
A consequence of the conservation of etendue is the brightness theorem, which states that no linear optical system can increase the brightness of the light emitted from a source to a higher value than the brightness of the surface of that source (where "brightness" is defined as the optical power emitted per unit solid angle per unit emitting or receiving area).

== Conservation of basic radiance ==
Radiance of a surface is related to etendue by:

$$L_{\mathrm{e},\Omega} = n^2 \frac{\partial \Phi_\mathrm{e}}{\partial G}\,,$$

where

- Φ_{e} is the radiant flux emitted, reflected, transmitted or received;
- n is the refractive index in which that surface is immersed;
- G is the étendue of the light beam.

As the light travels through an ideal optical system, both the etendue and the radiant flux are conserved. Therefore, basic radiance defined as:

$$L_{\mathrm{e},\Omega}^* = \frac{L_{\mathrm{e},\Omega}}{n^2}$$

is also conserved. In real systems, the etendue may increase (for example due to scattering) or the radiant flux may decrease (for example due to absorption) and, therefore, basic radiance may decrease. However, etendue may not decrease and radiant flux may not increase and, therefore, basic radiance may not increase.

== As a volume in phase space ==
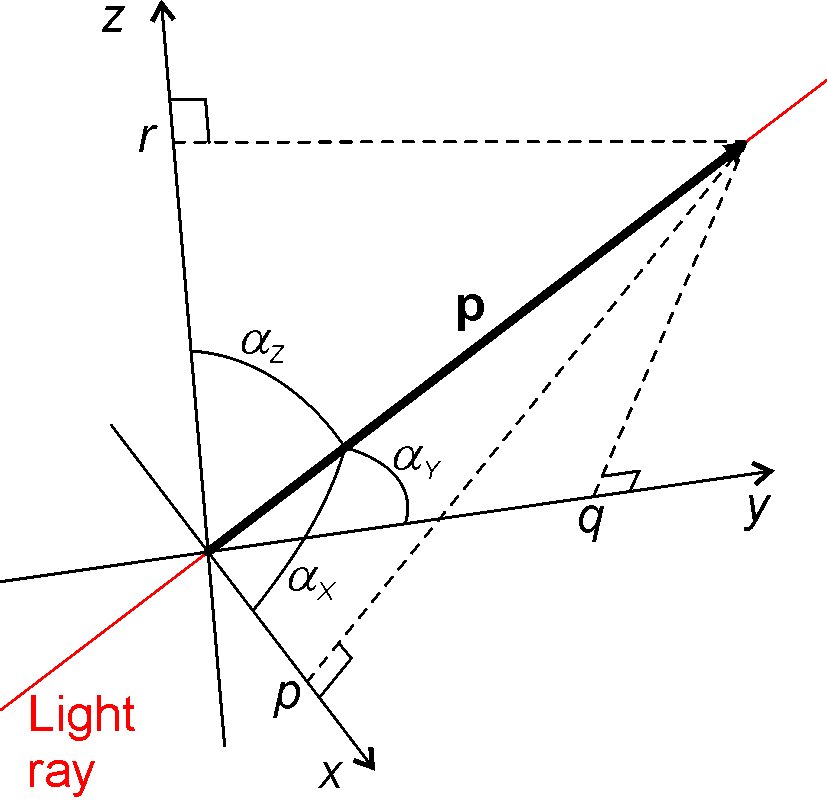
Optical momentum.

In the context of Hamiltonian optics, at a point in space, a light ray may be completely defined by a point r = (x, y, z), a unit Euclidean vector v = (cos α_{X}, cos α_{Y}, cos α_{Z}) indicating its direction and the refractive index n at point r. The optical momentum of the ray at that point is defined by

$$\mathbf{p} = n(\cos \alpha_X, \cos \alpha_Y, \cos \alpha_Z) = (p, q, r)\,,$$

where ‖p‖ = n. The geometry of the optical momentum vector is illustrated in figure "optical momentum".

In a spherical coordinate system p may be written as

$$\mathbf{p} = n\!\left(\sin \theta \cos \varphi, \sin \theta \sin \varphi, \cos \theta \right)\,,$$

from which

$$\mathrm{d}p\, \mathrm{d}q = \frac{\partial(p, q)}{\partial(\theta, \varphi)} \mathrm{d}\theta\, \mathrm{d}\varphi = \left(\frac{\partial p}{\partial \theta} \frac{\partial q}{\partial \varphi} - \frac{\partial p}{\partial \varphi} \frac{\partial q}{\partial \theta}\right) \mathrm{d}\theta\, \mathrm{d}\varphi = n^2 \cos \theta \sin \theta\, \mathrm{d}\theta\, \mathrm{d}\varphi = n^2 \cos \theta\, \mathrm{d}\Omega\,,$$

and therefore, for an infinitesimal area dS = dx dy on the xy-plane immersed in a medium of refractive index n, the etendue is given by

$$\mathrm{d}G = n^2\, \mathrm{d}S \cos \theta\, \mathrm{d}\Omega = \mathrm{d}x\, \mathrm{d}y\, \mathrm{d}p\, \mathrm{d}q\,,$$

which is an infinitesimal volume in phase space x, y, p, q. Conservation of etendue in phase space is the equivalent in optics to Liouville's theorem in classical mechanics. Etendue as volume in phase space is commonly used in nonimaging optics.

== Maximum concentration ==
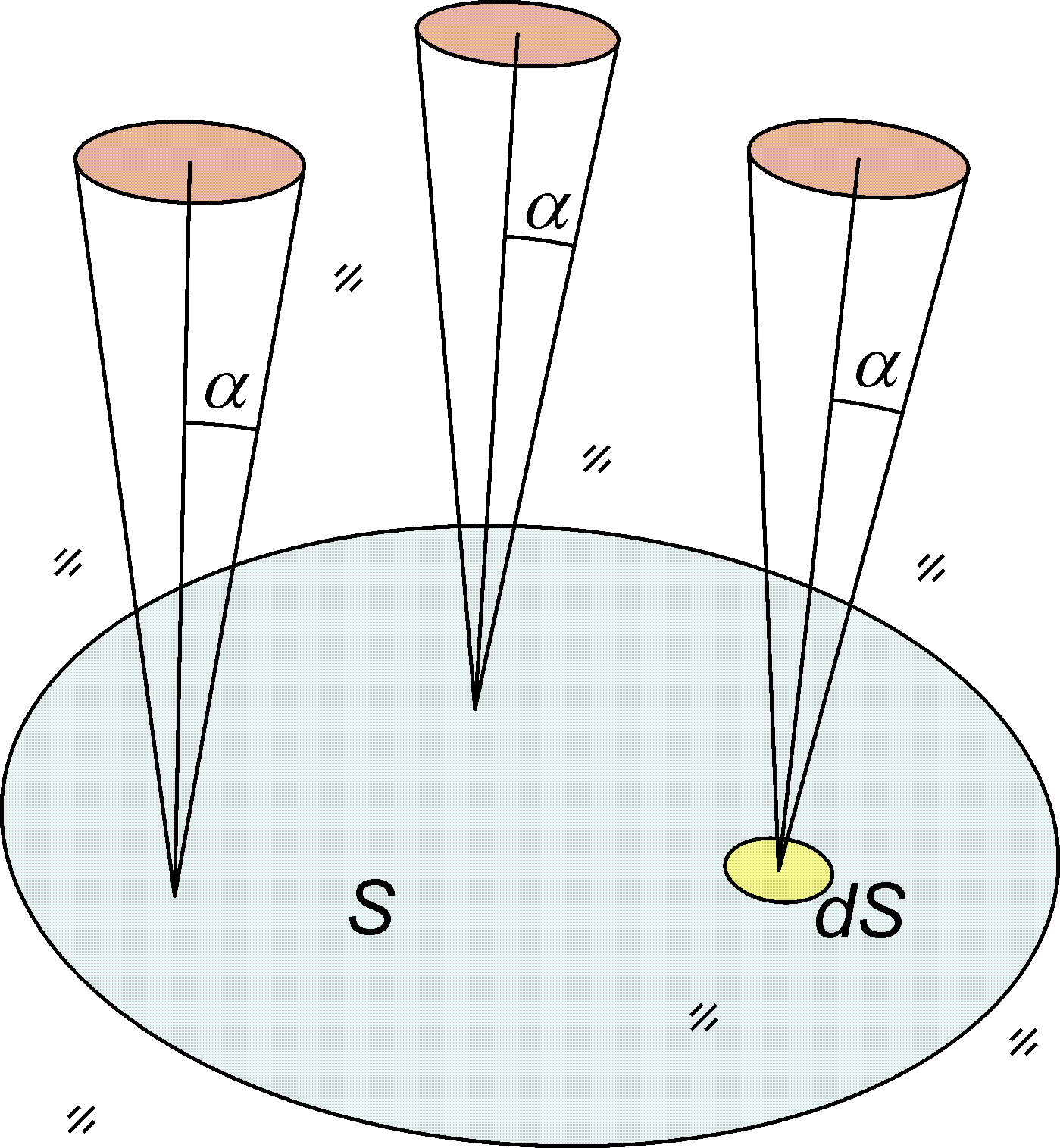
Etendue for a large solid angle.

Consider an infinitesimal surface dS, immersed in a medium of refractive index n crossed by (or emitting) light inside a cone of angle α. The etendue of this light is given by

$$\mathrm{d}G = n^2\, \mathrm{d}S \int \cos \theta\, \mathrm{d}\Omega = n^2 \mathrm{d}S \int_0^{2\pi}\!\int_0^\alpha \cos \theta \sin \theta\, \mathrm{d}\theta\, \mathrm{d}\varphi = \pi n^2 \mathrm{d}S \sin^2 \alpha\,.$$

Noting that n sin α is the numerical aperture NA, of the beam of light, this can also be expressed as

$$\mathrm{d}G = \pi\, \mathrm{d}S\, \mathrm{NA}^2\,.$$

Note that dΩ is expressed in a spherical coordinate system. Now, if a large surface S is crossed by (or emits) light also confined to a cone of angle α, the etendue of the light crossing S is

$$G = \pi n^2 \sin^2 \alpha \int \mathrm{d}S = \pi n^2 S \sin^2 \alpha = \pi S \,\mathrm{NA}^2\,.$$

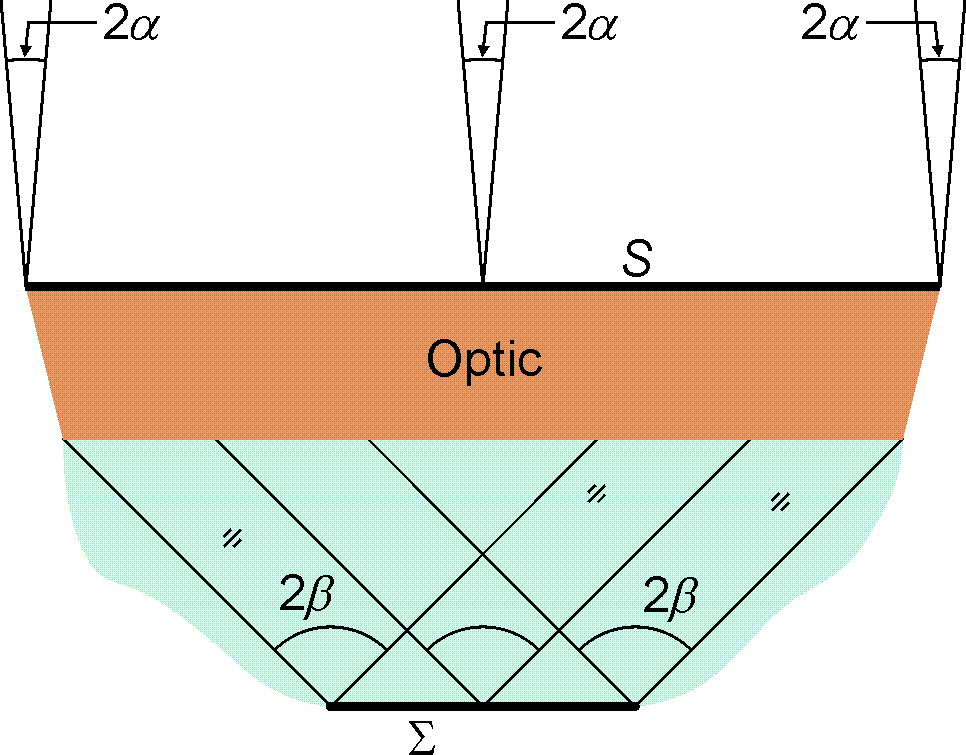
Etendue and ideal concentration.

The limit on maximum concentration (shown) is an optic with an entrance aperture S, in air (n_{i} = 1) collecting light within a solid angle of angle 2α (its acceptance angle) and sending it to a smaller area receiver Σ immersed in a medium of refractive index n, whose points are illuminated within a solid angle of angle 2β. From the above expression, the etendue of the incoming light is

$$G_\mathrm{i} = \pi S \sin^2 \alpha$$

and the etendue of the light reaching the receiver is

$$G_\mathrm{r} = \pi n^2 \Sigma \sin^2 \beta\,.$$

Conservation of etendue G_{i} = G_{r} then gives

$$C = \frac{S}{\Sigma} = n^2 \frac{\sin^2 \beta}{\sin^2 \alpha}\,,$$

where C is the concentration of the optic. For a given angular aperture α, of the incoming light, this concentration will be maximum for the maximum value of sin β, that is β = π/2. The maximum possible concentration is then

$$C_\mathrm{max} = \frac{n^2}{\sin^2 \alpha}\,.$$

In the case that the incident index is not unity, we have

$$G_\mathrm{i} = \pi n_\mathrm{i} S \sin^2 \alpha = G_\mathrm{r} = \pi n_\mathrm{r} \Sigma \sin^2 \beta\,,$$

and so

$$C = \left(\frac{\mathrm{NA}_\mathrm{r}}{\mathrm{NA}_\mathrm{i}}\right)^2\,,$$

and in the best-case limit of β = π/2, this becomes

$$C_\mathrm{max} = \frac{n_\mathrm{r}^2}{\mathrm{NA}_\mathrm{i}^2}\,.$$

If the optic were a collimator instead of a concentrator, the light direction is reversed and conservation of etendue gives us the minimum aperture, S, for a given output full angle 2α.

== See also ==
- Beam emittance
- Beam parameter product
- Light field
- Noether's theorem
- Symplectic geometry
