= Rayleigh length =

Concept in laser optics

Gaussian beam width $w(z)$ as a function of the axial distance $z$. $w_0$: beam waist; $b$: confocal parameter; $z_\mathrm{R}$: Rayleigh length; $\Theta$: total angular spread

In optics and especially laser science, the Rayleigh length or Rayleigh range, $z_\mathrm{R}$, is the distance along the propagation direction of a beam from the waist to the place where the area of the cross section is doubled. A related parameter is the confocal parameter, b, which is twice the Rayleigh length. The Rayleigh length is particularly important when beams are modeled as Gaussian beams.

== Explanation ==
For a Gaussian beam propagating in free space along the $\hat{z}$ axis with wave number $k = 2\pi/\lambda$, the Rayleigh length is given by

$$z_\mathrm{R} = \frac{\pi w_0^2}{\lambda} = \frac{1}{2} k w_0^2$$

where $\lambda$ is the wavelength (the vacuum wavelength divided by $n$, the index of refraction) and $w_0$ is the beam waist, the radial size of the beam at its narrowest point. This equation and those that follow assume that the waist is not extraordinarily small; $w_0 \ge 2\lambda/\pi$.

The radius of the beam at a distance $z$ from the waist is

$$w(z) = w_0 \, \sqrt{ 1+ {\left( \frac{z}{z_\mathrm{R}} \right)}^2 }  .$$

The minimum value of $w(z)$ occurs at $w(0) = w_0$, by definition. At distance $z_\mathrm{R}$ from the beam waist, the beam radius is increased by a factor $\sqrt{2}$ and the cross sectional area by 2.

== Related quantities ==
The total angular spread of a Gaussian beam in radians is related to the Rayleigh length by

$$\Theta_{\mathrm{div}} \simeq 2\frac{w_0}{z_R}.$$

The diameter of the beam at its waist (focus spot size) is given by

$$D = 2\,w_0 \simeq \frac{4\lambda}{\pi\, \Theta_{\mathrm{div}}}$$.

These equations are valid within the limits of the paraxial approximation. For beams with much larger divergence the Gaussian beam model is no longer accurate and a physical optics analysis is required.

== See also ==
- Beam divergence
- Beam parameter product
- Gaussian function
- Electromagnetic wave equation
- John Strutt, 3rd Baron Rayleigh
- Robert Strutt, 4th Baron Rayleigh
- Depth of field
