= Smith–Helmholtz invariant =

In optics the Smith–Helmholtz invariant is an invariant quantity for paraxial beams propagating through an optical system. Given an object at height $\bar{y}$ and an axial ray passing through the same axial position as the object with angle $u$, the invariant is defined by

$$H = n\bar{y}u$$,

where $n$ is the refractive index. For a given optical system and specific choice of object height and axial ray, this quantity is invariant under refraction. Therefore, at the $i$th conjugate image point with height $\bar{y}_i$ and refracted axial ray with angle $u_i$ in medium with index of refraction $n_i$ we have $H = n_i \bar{y}_i u_i$. Typically the two points of most interest are the object point and the final image point.

The Smith–Helmholtz invariant has a close connection with the Abbe sine condition. The paraxial version of the sine condition is satisfied if the ratio $n u / n' u'$ is constant, where $u$ and $n$ are the axial ray angle and refractive index in object space and $u'$ and $n'$ are the corresponding quantities in image space. The Smith–Helmholtz invariant implies that the lateral magnification, $y/y'$ is constant if and only if the sine condition is satisfied.

The Smith–Helmholtz invariant also relates the lateral and angular magnification of the optical system, which are $y'/y$ and $u'/u$ respectively. Applying the invariant to the object and image points implies the product of these magnifications is given by

$$\frac{y'}{y} \frac{u'}{u} = \frac{n}{n'}$$

The Smith–Helmholtz invariant is closely related to the Lagrange invariant and the optical invariant. The Smith–Helmholtz is the optical invariant restricted to conjugate image planes.

== See also ==
- Etendue
- Lagrange invariant
- Abbe sine condition
