= Gebhart factor =

The Gebhart factors are used in radiative heat transfer, it is a means to describe the ratio of radiation absorbed by any other surface versus the total emitted radiation from given surface. As such, it becomes the radiation exchange factor between a number of surfaces. The Gebhart factors calculation method is supported in several radiation heat transfer tools, such as TMG and TRNSYS.

The method was introduced by Benjamin Gebhart in 1957. Although a requirement is the calculation of the view factors beforehand, it requires less computational power, compared to using ray tracing with the Monte Carlo Method (MCM). Alternative methods are to look at the radiosity, which Hottel and others build upon.

== Equations ==
The Gebhart factor can be given as:

$$B_{ij} = \frac{\mbox{Energy absorbed at }A_{j}\mbox{ originating as emission at } A_{i}}{\mbox{Total radiation emitted from }A_{i}}$$

.

The Gebhart factor approach assumes that the surfaces are gray and emits and are illuminated diffusely and uniformly.

This can be rewritten as:

$$B_{ij} = \frac{ Q_{ij}} {\epsilon_{i}  \cdot A_{i}  \cdot \sigma  \cdot T_{i}^{4}}$$

where

- $B_{ij}$ is the Gebhart factor
- $Q_{ij}$ is the heat transfer from surface i to j
- $\epsilon$ is the emissivity of the surface
- $A$ is the surface area
- $T$ is the temperature

The denominator can also be recognized from the Stefan–Boltzmann law.

The $B_{ij}$ factor can then be used to calculate the net energy transferred from one surface to all other, for an opaque surface given as:

$q_{i} = A_{i} \cdot \epsilon_i \cdot \sigma \cdot T_{i}^4 - \sum_{j=1}^{N_s} A_{j} \cdot \epsilon_{j} \cdot \sigma \cdot B_{ji} \cdot T_{j}^4$

where

- $q_{i}$ is the net heat transfer for surface i

Looking at the geometric relation, it can be seen that:

$$\epsilon_{i} \cdot  A_{i}  \cdot B_{ij} = \epsilon_{j}  \cdot A_{j}  \cdot B_{ji}$$

This can be used to write the net energy transfer from one surface to another, here for 1 to 2:

$$q_{1-2} = A_{1} \cdot  \epsilon_{1}  \cdot B_{12}  \cdot \sigma  \cdot (T_{1}^4-T_{2}^4)$$

Realizing that this can be used to find the heat transferred (Q), which was used in the definition, and using the view factors as auxiliary equation, it can be shown that the Gebhart factors are:

$$B_{ij} =  F_{ij}  \cdot \epsilon_j  + \sum_{k=1}^{N_s}((1-\epsilon_k) \cdot F_{ik}  \cdot B_{kj})$$

where

- $F_{ij}$ is the view factor for surface i to j

And also, from the definition we see that the sum of the Gebhart factors must be equal to 1.

$$\sum_{j=1}^{N_s}(B_{ij}) = 1$$

Several approaches exists to describe this as a system of linear equations that can be solved by Gaussian elimination or similar methods. For simpler cases it can also be formulated as a single expression.

== See also ==
- Radiosity
- Thermal radiation
- Black body
