= Beam parameter product =

Measure of laser beam quality

In laser science, the beam parameter product (BPP) is the product of a laser beam's divergence angle (half-angle) and the radius of the beam at its narrowest point (the beam waist). The BPP quantifies the quality of a laser beam, and how well it can be focused to a small spot.

A Gaussian beam has the lowest possible BPP, $\lambda/\pi$, where $\lambda$ is the wavelength of the light. The ratio of the BPP of an actual beam to that of an ideal Gaussian beam at the same wavelength is denoted M^{2} ("M squared"). This parameter is a wavelength-independent measure of beam quality.

The general wave equation, assuming paraxial approximation, yields:

$$\mathrm{BPP} = \varphi \cdot w_0 = M^2 \cdot \frac{\lambda}{\pi}$$.

With:

$\varphi$ the half angle in far field
$w_0$ the beam waist
$M^2$ the beam quality factor, M squared
$\lambda$ the wavelength.

The quality of a beam is important for many applications. In fiber-optic communications beams with an M^{2} close to 1 are required for coupling to single-mode optical fiber. Laser machine shops care a lot about the M^{2} parameter of their lasers because the beams will focus to an area that is M^{4} times larger than that of a Gaussian beam with the same wavelength and D4σ waist width; in other words, the fluence scales as 1/M^{4}. The rule of thumb is that M^{2} increases as the laser power increases. It is difficult to obtain excellent beam quality and high average power (100 W to kWs) due to thermal lensing in the laser gain medium.

== Measurement ==
There are several ways to define the width of a beam. When measuring the beam parameter product and M^{2}, one uses the D4σ or "second moment" width of the beam to determine both the radius of the beam's waist and the divergence in the far field.

The BPP can be easily measured by placing an array detector or scanning-slit profiler at multiple positions within the beam after focusing it with a lens of high optical quality and known focal length. To properly obtain the BPP and M^{2} the following steps must be followed:

1. Measure the D4σ widths at 5 axial positions near the beam waist (the location where the beam is narrowest).
2. Measure the D4σ widths at 5 axial positions at least one Rayleigh length away from the waist.
3. Fit the 10 measured data points to $W^2(z) = W_0^2 + M^4 \left(\frac{\lambda}{\pi W_0}\right)^2(z-z_0)^2$, where $W(z) = 2\sigma(z) = \tfrac 1 2 \text{D4}\sigma(z)$ and $\sigma^2(z)$ is the second moment of the distribution in the x or y direction (see Beam diameter § D4σ or second-moment width), and $z_0$ is the location of the beam waist with second moment width of $\sigma_0$. Fitting the 10 data points yields M^{2}, $z_0$, and $\sigma_0$. Siegman showed that all beam profiles—Gaussian, flat top, TEMxy, or any shape—must follow the equation above provided that the beam radius uses the D4σ definition of the beam width. Using other definitions of beam width does not work.

In principle, one could use a single measurement at the waist to obtain the waist diameter, a single measurement in the far field to obtain the divergence, and then use these to calculate the BPP. The procedure above gives a more accurate result in practice, however.

High-power lasers, such as those used in laser welding and cutting are typically measured by using a beamsplitter to sample the beam. The sampled beam has much lower intensity and can be measured by a scanning-slit or knife-edge profiler. Good beam quality is very important in laser welding and cutting operations.

== See also ==
- Etendue
- List of laser articles
