= Lagrange invariant =

Measure of the light propagating through an optical system

In optics the Lagrange invariant is a measure of the light propagating through an optical system. It is defined by

$$H = n\overline{u}y - nu\overline{y}$$,

where y and u are the marginal ray height and angle respectively, and ȳ and ū are the chief ray height and angle. n is the ambient refractive index. In order to reduce confusion with other quantities, the symbol Ж may be used in place of H. Ж^{2} is proportional to the throughput of the optical system (related to étendue). For a given optical system, the Lagrange invariant is a constant throughout all space, that is, it is invariant upon refraction and transfer.

The optical invariant is a generalization of the Lagrange invariant which is formed using the ray heights and angles of any two rays. For these rays, the optical invariant is a constant throughout all space.

== See also ==
- Etendue
- Smith-Helmholtz invariant
- Abbe sine condition
