= Launch numerical aperture =

Numerical aperture of an optical system used to couple power into an optical fiber

In telecommunications, launch numerical aperture (LNA) is the numerical aperture of an optical system used to couple (launch) power into an optical fiber.

LNA may differ from the stated NA of a final focusing element if, for example, that element is underfilled or the focus is other than that for which the element is specified. LNA is one of the parameters that determine the initial distribution of power among the modes of an optical fiber.
