= Critical focus =

Photograph area

In a photograph, the area of critical focus is the portion of the picture that is optically in focus. This does not relate to depth of field which describes apparent sharpness. Reducing the size of the aperture will increase the depth of field but the plane of critical focus will not change. Depth of field extends away from the plane of critical sharpness.

The image is only critically in focus within a plane. The formula that describes the relationship between plane of sharpness, lens and film is

$$1/I+1/O = 1/F$$,

where $I$ is the film to lens distance, $O$ is the distance from the lens to the plane of critical focus (in the object space), and $F$ is the focal length of the lens.

'Critical Focus' is also the title of a regular column by Brian J. Ford in the American magazine The Microscope.

== See also ==
- Sharpness (visual)
