= Acceptance angle (solar concentrator) =

Maximum angle at which incoming sunlight can be captured by a solar concentrator

Acceptance angle is the maximum angle at which incoming sunlight can be captured by a solar concentrator. Its value depends on the concentration of the optic and the refractive index in which the receiver is immersed. Maximizing the acceptance angle of a concentrator is desirable in practical systems and it may be achieved by using nonimaging optics.

For concentrators that concentrate light in two dimensions, the acceptance angle may be different in the two directions.

== Definition ==
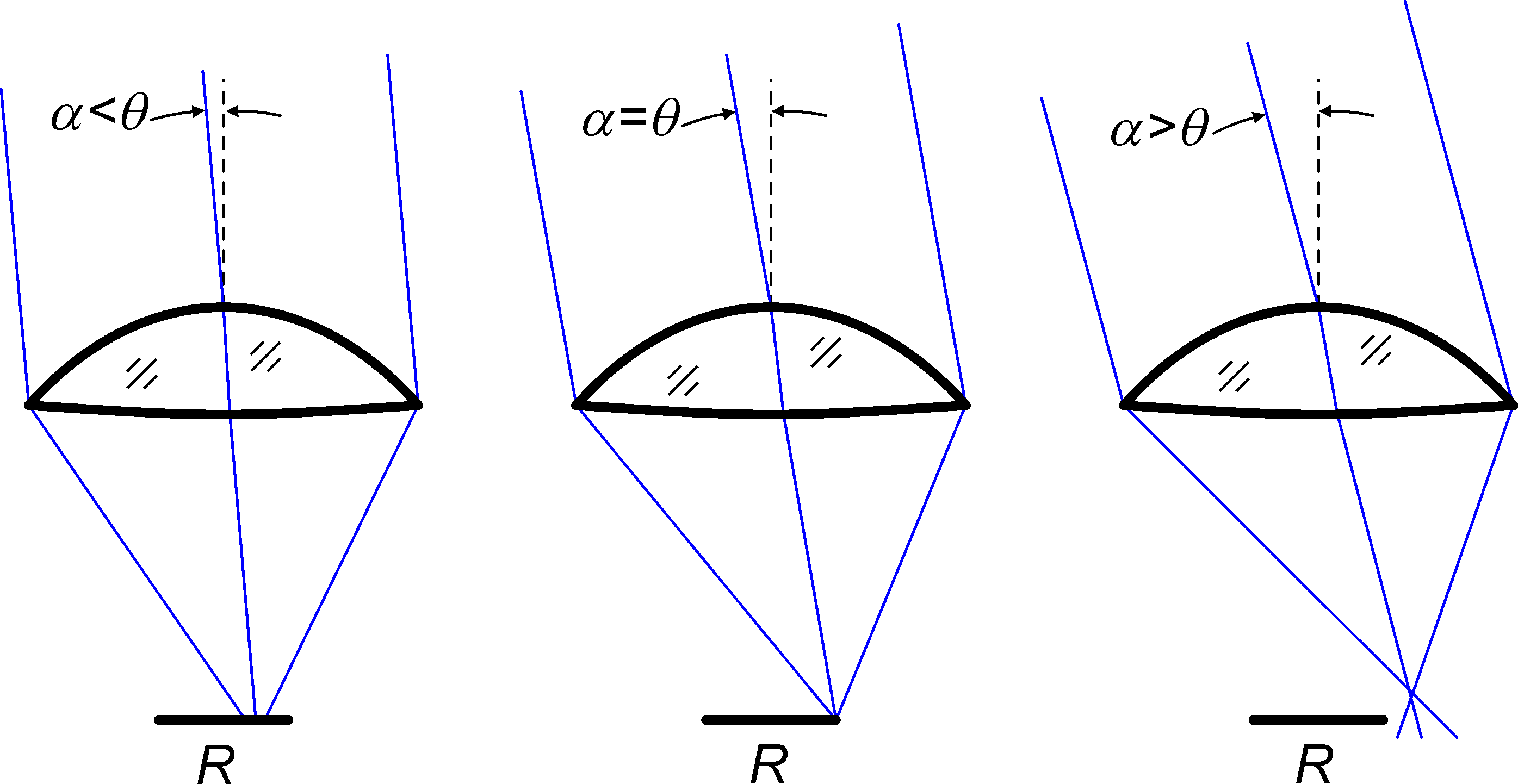
Acceptance angle

The "acceptance angle" figure illustrates this concept.

The concentrator is a lens with a receiver R. The left section of the figure shows a set of parallel rays incident on the concentrator at an angle α < θ to the optical axis. All rays end up on the receiver and, therefore, all light is captured. In the center, this figure shows another set of parallel rays, now incident on the concentrator at an angle α = θ to the optical axis. For an ideal concentrator, all rays are still captured. However, on the right, this figure shows yet another set of parallel rays, now incident on the concentrator at an angle α > θ to the optical axis. All rays now miss the receiver and all light is lost. Therefore, for incidence angles α < θ all light is captured while for incidence angles α > θ all light is lost. The concentrator is then said to have a (half) acceptance angle θ, or a total acceptance angle 2θ (since it accepts light within an angle ±θ to the optical axis).

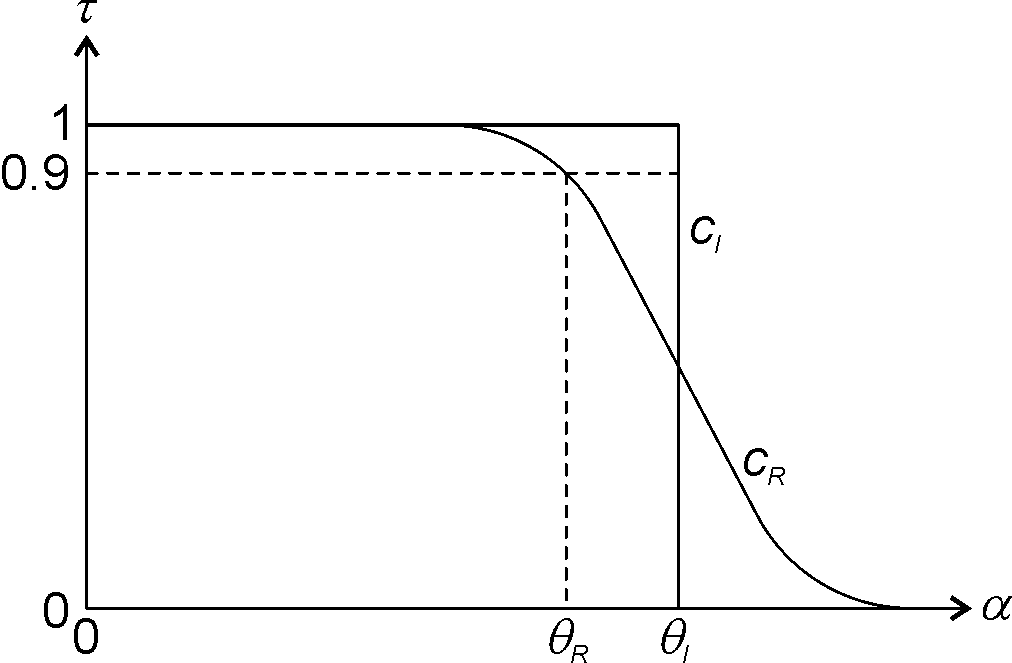
Transmission curves

Ideally, a solar concentrator has a transmission curve c_{I} as shown in the "transmission curves" figure. Transmission (efficiency) is τ = 1 for all incidence angles α < θ_{I} and τ = 0 for all incidence angles α > θ_{I}.

In practice, real transmission curves are not perfect and they typically have a shape similar to that of curve c_{R}, which is normalized so that τ = 1 for α = 0. In that case, the real acceptance angle θ_{R} is typically defined as the angle for which transmission τ drops to 90% of its maximum.

For line-focus systems, such as a trough concentrator or a linear Fresnel lens, the acceptance angle is one dimensional, and the concentration has only weak dependence on off-pointing perpendicular to the focus direction. Point focus systems, on the other hand, are sensitive to off-pointing in both directions. In the general case, the acceptance angle in one direction may be different from the other.

== Acceptance angle as a tolerance budget ==
The acceptance angle θ of a concentrator may be seen as a measure of how precisely it must track the sun in the sky. The smaller the θ, the more precise the tracking needs to be or the concentrator will not capture the incoming sunlight. It is, therefore, a measure of the tolerance a concentrator has to tracking errors.

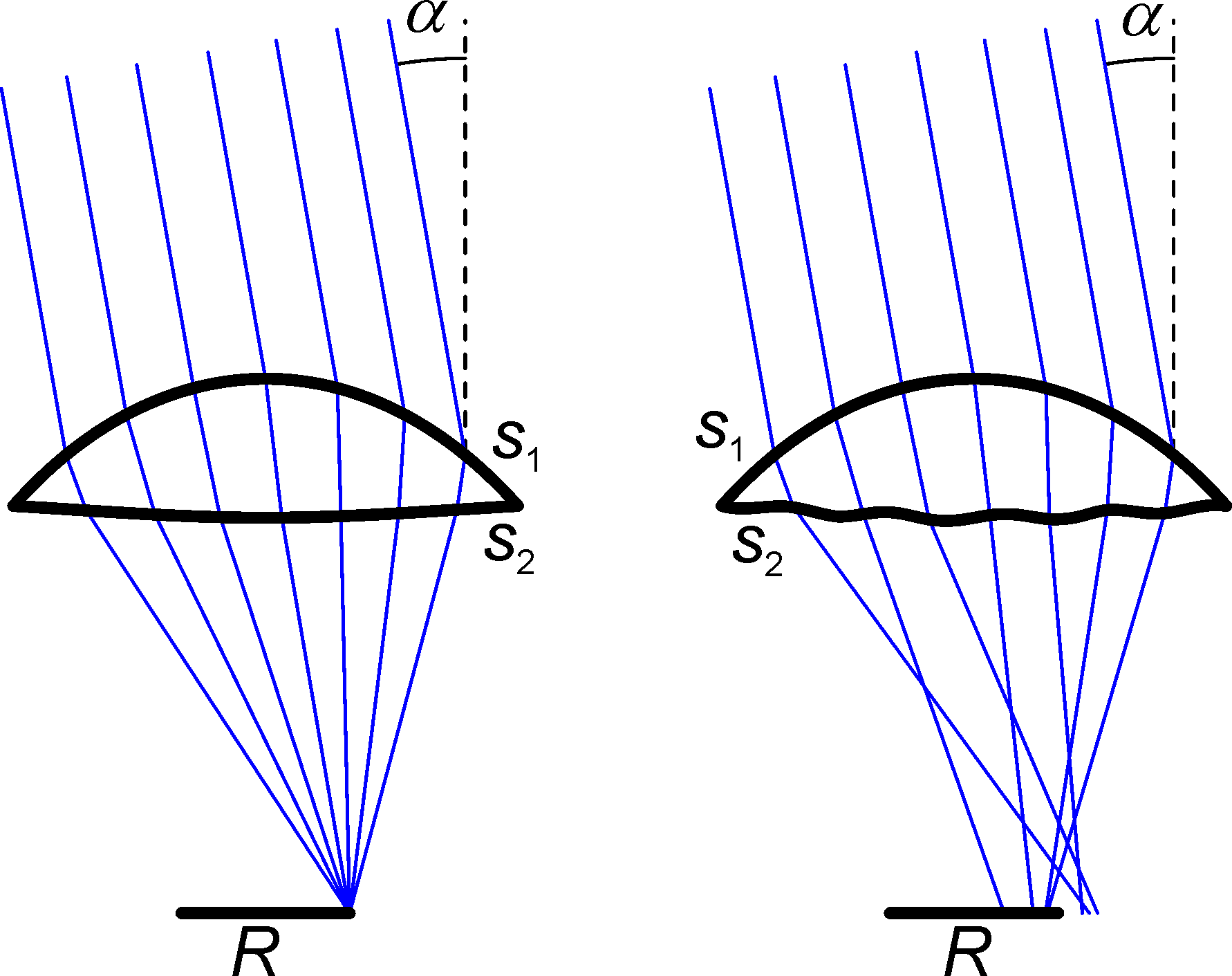
Optical imperfections

However, other errors also affect the acceptance angle. The "optical imperfections" figure shows this.

The left part of the figure shows a perfectly made lens with good optical surfaces s_{1} and s_{2} capturing all light rays incident at an angle α to the optical axis. However, real optics are never perfect and the right part of the figure shows the effect of a badly made bottom surface s_{2}. Instead of being smooth, s_{2} now has undulations and some of the light rays that were captured before are now lost. This decreases the transmission of the concentrator for incidence angle α, decreasing the acceptance angle. Actually, any imperfection in the system such as:

- tracking inaccuracy
- imperfectly manufactured optics
- optical aberrations
- imperfectly assembled components
- movements of the system due to wind
- finite stiffness of the supporting structure
- deformation due to aging
- other imperfections in the system

contributes to a decrease in the acceptance angle of the concentrator. The acceptance angle may then be seen as a "tolerance budget" to be spent on all these imperfections. At the end, the concentrator must still have enough acceptance to capture sunlight which also has some angular dispersion θ_{S} when seen from earth. It is, therefore, very important to design a concentrator with the widest possible acceptance angle. That is possible using nonimaging optics, which maximize the acceptance angle for a given concentration.

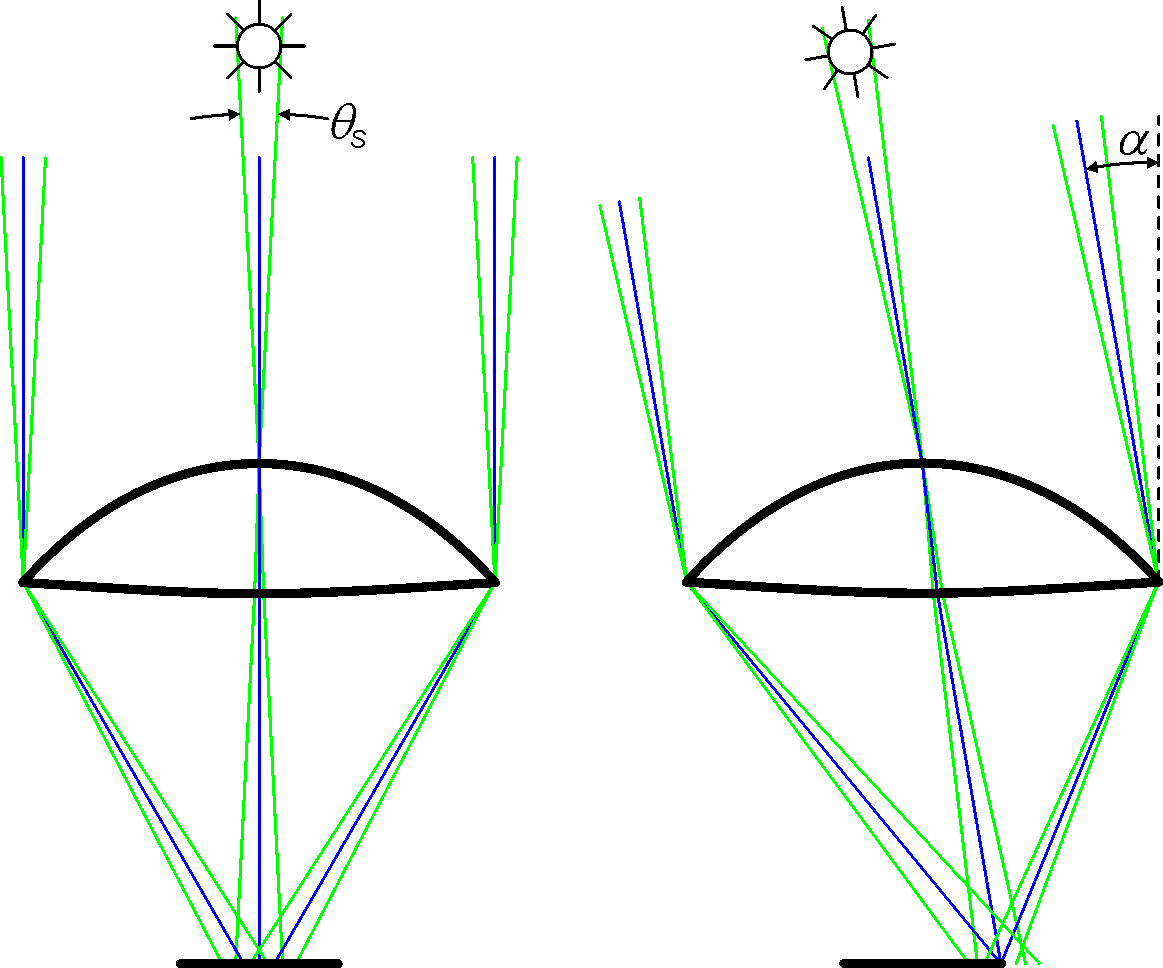
Angular aperture of sunlight

Figure "angular aperture of sunlight" on the right shows the effect of the angular dispersion of sunlight on the acceptance angle.

Sunlight is not a set of perfectly parallel rays (shown in blue), but it has a given angular aperture θ_{S}, as indicated by the green rays. If the acceptance angle of the optic is wide enough, sunlight incident along the optical axis will be captured by the concentrator, as shown in the "angular aperture of sunlight" figure. However, for wider incidence angles α some light may be lost, as shown on the right. Perfectly parallel rays (shown in blue) would be captured, but sunlight, due to its angular aperture, is partially lost.

Parallel rays and sunlight are therefore transmitted differently by a solar concentrator and the corresponding transmission curves are also different. Different acceptance angles may then be determined for parallel rays or for sunlight.

== Concentration acceptance product (CAP) ==
For concentration systems operating in air (or vacuum) using mirrors or lenses, the maximum theoretical concentration possible, C_{max}, is given by

$$C_\mathrm{max} = \frac{1}{\sin^2\theta}$$,

where θ is the half-angle of acceptance.

If the receiver is immersed in a medium of refractive index n (for example, if a refractive secondary concentrator is used that is in direct optical contact with the receiver), this theoretical concentration ratio can be increased by the square of that refractive index:

$$C_\mathrm{max} = \frac{n^2}{\sin^2\theta}$$,

In practice, real concentrators either have a lower than ideal concentration for a given acceptance or they have a lower than ideal acceptance angle for a given concentration. This can be summarized in the expression

$$CAP =  \sqrt{C} \sin\theta \le n$$,

which defines a quantity CAP (concentration acceptance product), which must be smaller than the refractive index of the medium in which the receiver is immersed.

For a linear-focused (one-dimensional) concentrator, the equation is not squared

$$C_\mathrm{max} = \frac{n}{\sin\theta}$$

The Concentration Acceptance Product is a consequence of the conservation of etendue. The higher the CAP, the closer the concentrator is to the maximum possible in concentration and acceptance angle.

== See also ==
- Etendue
- Guided ray, acceptance angle context for optic fibres
