= Pencil-beam scanning =

Practice of steering a beam of radiation or charged particles across an object

Pencil beam scanning is the practice of steering a beam of radiation or charged particles across an object. It is often used in proton therapy, to reduce unnecessary radiation exposure to surrounding non-cancerous cells.

== Ionizing radiation ==
Ionizing radiation photons or x-rays (IMRT) use pencil beam scanning to precisely target a tumor. Photon pencil beam scans are defined as crossing of two beams to a fine point.

== Charged particles ==
Several charged particles devices used with Proton therapy cancer centers use pencil beam scanning. The newer proton therapy machines use a pencil beam scanning technology. This technique is also called spot scanning. The Paul Scherrer Institute was the developer of spot beam.

== Intensity Modulated Proton Therapy ==
Varian's IMPT system uses all pencil-beam controlled protons where the beam intensity can also be controlled at this small level. This can be done by going back and forth over a previously radiated area during the same radiation session.

== See also ==
- Pencil (mathematics)
- Pencil (optics)
- Radiation treatment planning
- mean free path
- Monte Carlo method for photon transport
- Hybrid theory for photon transport in tissue
- Diffusion theory
- Monte Carlo method
- Varian Medical Systems
