= Pencil (optics) =

Narrow beam of electromagnetic radiation or charged particles

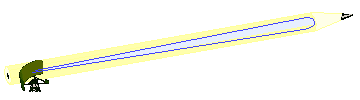
A pencil-beam radar

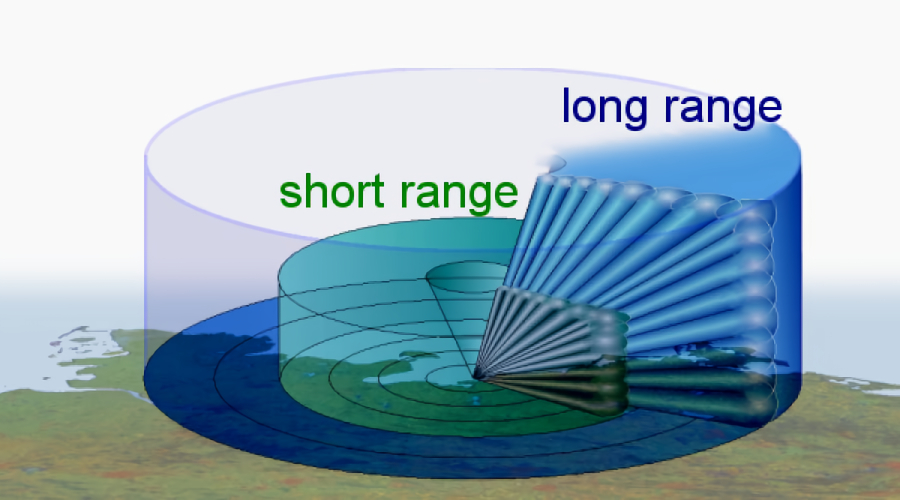
A moving or sweeping pencil-beam radar

In optics, a pencil or pencil of rays, also known as a pencil beam or narrow beam, is a geometric construct (pencil of half-lines) used to describe a beam or portion of a beam of electromagnetic radiation or charged particles, typically in the form of a cone or cylinder.

Antennas which strongly bundle in azimuth and elevation are often described as "pencil-beam" antennas. For example, a phased array antenna can send out a beam that is extremely thin. Such antennas are used for tracking radar, and the process is known as beamforming.

In optics, the focusing action of a lens is often described in terms of pencils of rays. In addition to conical and cylindrical pencils, optics deals with astigmatic pencils as well.

In electron optics, scanning electron microscopes use narrow pencil beams to achieve a deep depth of field.

Ionizing radiation used in radiation therapy, whether photons or charged particles, such as proton therapy and electron therapy machines, is sometimes delivered through the use of pencil beam scanning.

In backscatter X-ray imaging a pencil beam of x-ray radiation is used to scan over an object to create an intensity image of the Compton-scattered radiation.

== History ==
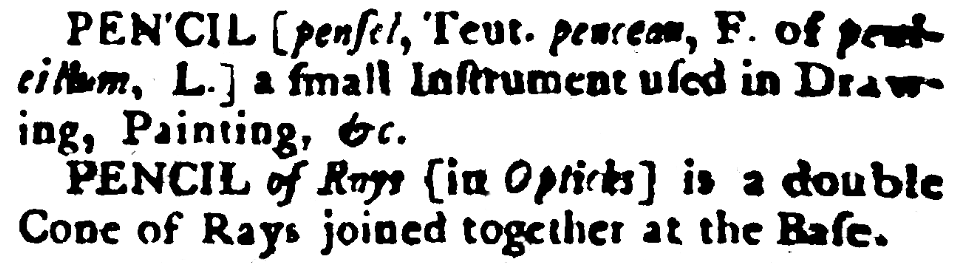
In 1675, a pencil was interpreted as a double cone of rays, as from an object point, through a lens, to an image point.

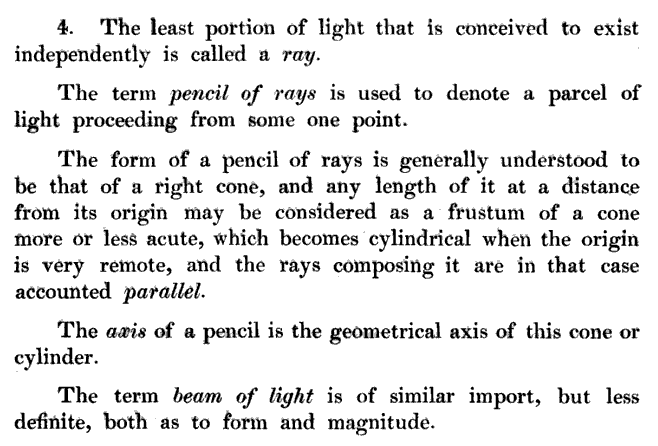
Definitions of ray, pencil, and beam in Henry Coddington's 1829 A System of Optics, Part 1

A 1675 work describes a pencil as "a double cone of rays, joined together at the base." In his 1829 A System of Optics, Henry Coddington defines a pencil as being "a parcel of light proceeding from some one point", whose form is "generally understood to be that of a right cone" and which "becomes cylindrical when the origin is very remote".

== See also ==
- Collimated beam
- Fan beam
- Pencil beam scanning (Medical physics)
- Microwave transmission
