= Microprinting =

Printing at a small scale

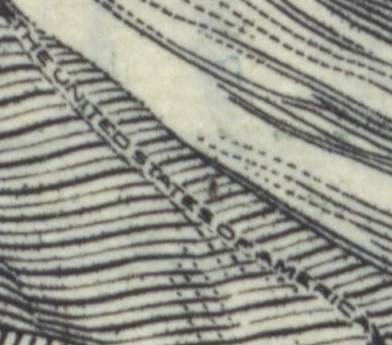
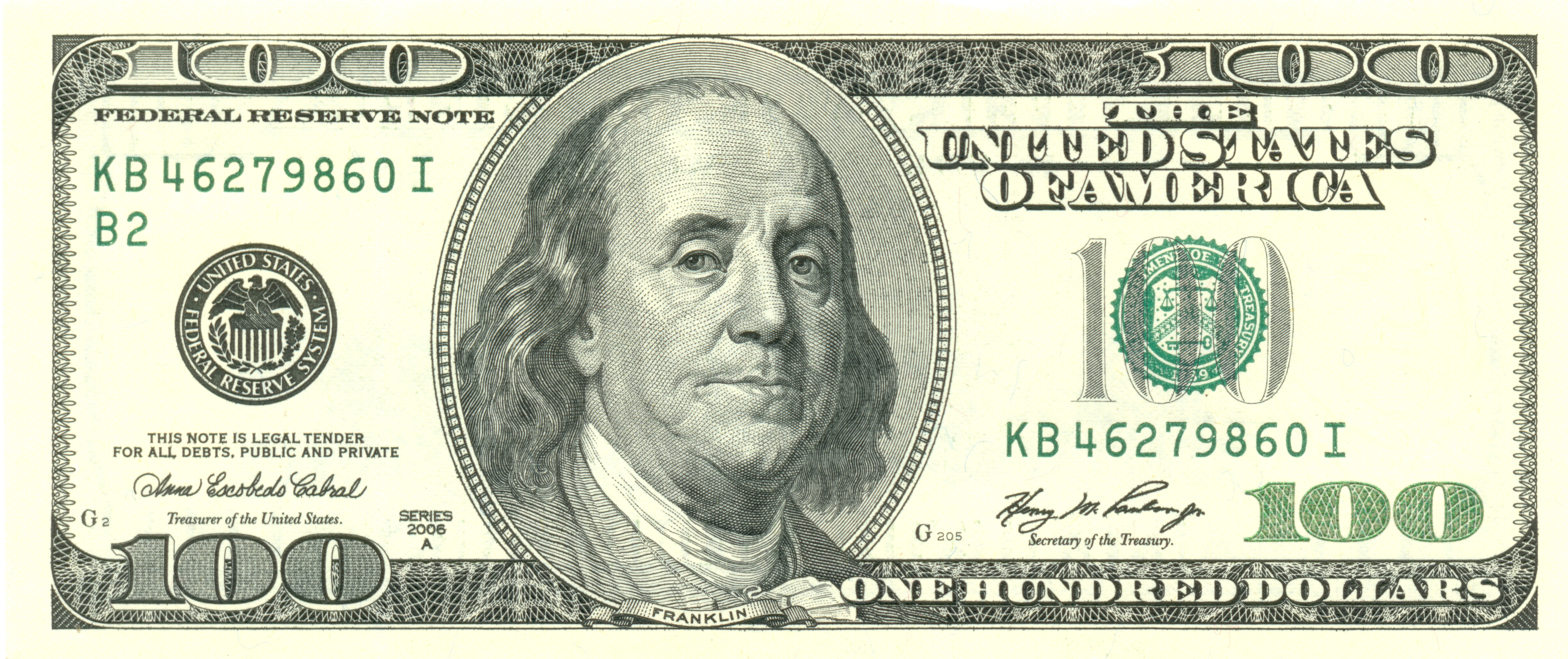
Close-up of microprint incorporated on US$100 paper currency, hidden in the collar of Franklin's shirt

Microprinting is the production of recognizable patterns or characters in a printed medium at a scale that typically requires magnification to read with the naked eye. To the unaided eye, the text may appear as a solid line. Attempts to reproduce by methods of photocopy, image scanning, or pantograph typically translate as a dotted or solid line, unless the reproduction method can identify and recreate patterns to such scale. Microprint is predominantly used as an anti-counterfeiting technique, due to its inability to be easily reproduced by widespread digital methods.

While microphotography precedes microprint, microprint was significantly influenced by Albert Boni in 1934 when he was inspired by his friend, writer and editor Manuel Komroff, who was showing his experimentations related to the enlarging of photographs. It occurred to Boni that if he could reduce rather than enlarge photographs, this technology might enable publication companies and libraries to access much greater quantities of data at a minimum cost of material and storage space. Over the following decade, Boni worked to develop microprint, a micro-opaque process in which pages were photographed using 35mm microfilm and printed on cards using offset lithography. (U.S. patent 2260551A, U.S. patent 2260552A) This process proved to produce a 6" by 9" index card that stored 100 pages of text from the normal-sized publications he was reproducing. Boni began the Readex Microprint company to produce and license this technology. He also published an article A Guide to the Literature of Photography and Related Subjects (1943), which appeared in a supplemental 18th issue of the Photo-Lab Index.

== Usage ==
Currency commonly exhibits the highest quality (smallest size) of microprint because it demands the highest level of counterfeiting deterrence. For example, on the series 2004 United States $20 bill, microprint is hidden within the border in the lower left corner of the obverse (front) side, as well as the Twenty USA background.

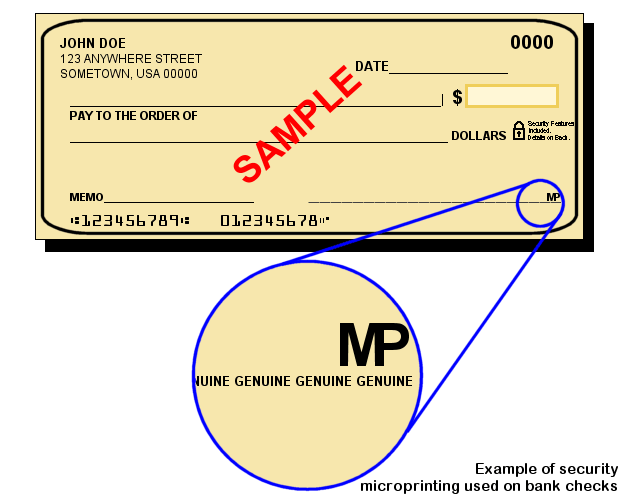
MP microprint commonly used on personal bank cheques

Bank cheques, as well as various other items of value may also commonly leverage microprinting methods, but generally not of such extreme size. For example, personal bank cheques commonly place the characters MP next to the signature line of the cheque; these characters represent microprint and indicate that the signature line or other cheque features are actually microprinted characters. The microprinted characters are used as an anti-counterfeiting feature due to their difficulty in being reproduced while the prominent MP serves as an overt deterrent warning that the item employs microprint.

While microprinting at some scales may be readable to the human eye without microscopy, there is no differentiation between microprinting at these different scales.

The first US postage stamp to incorporate microprinting was the American Wildflower Series introduced by The United States Postal Service in 1992. It was also the first commemorative stamp wholly produced by offset lithography. The USPS has since issued other stamps with more complex microprinting incorporated along with dates, words, and abbreviations such as USPS and even entire stamp designs composed of microprint letters.

There was passing interest in microprinting as a solution to book storage in libraries in the 1940s. Librarian Fremont Rider championed microprinting over micro-film for its reduced cost. He also suggested that entire books could be printed on the backs of library catalog cards, which are generally blank, replacing the storage of full-sized books on library shelves.

== Production ==
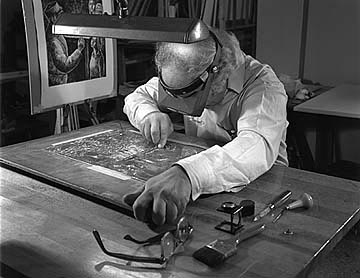
Preparing a lithographic printing plate

Microprint of the smallest scale is only producible by hand using engraved offset printing plates or some other method of intaglio (printmaking).

MICR

Digital microtext printers utilize specially designed fonts and ink for the purpose. The ink used is most commonly MICR (Magnetic Ink Character Recognition) toner particles but may also be polyester based toners and styrene acrylate polymer based toners. The ink is not limited to grayscale only, but may also use color toners or even more specialized toners containing dyes sensitive to ultraviolet or infrared radiation and producing fluorescence when exposed to those radiations.

Examples of several microfonts used in digital microprinting

Microprint of the scale capable by other printing methods cannot be produced by a digital printer regardless of the resolution of the device. Some digital fonts are designed specifically for the purpose of microprinting. These pseudo-microprint fonts are referred to as microtext.

Xerox was acclaimed for developing a microtext font they claimed could produce characters 1/100 of an inch tall (equivalent to 0.72 points).

In April 2015, Videojet Technologies released their 1650 High Resolution (HR) and 1620 HR Continuous Inkjet (CIJ) printers, said to be capable of printing sub-pixel size characters as small as 0.6 mm in height (equivalent to 1.70079 points). The printers use a 40-micron nozzle that outputs more than 100,000 drops of ink per second. While these printers make microprinting faster and easier to produce digitally, they still have not reached the true sub-pixel size of less than 1 point.

The smallest scale microtext a laser printer can produce is 0.5 pt.

== Microstructures ==
Using gold nanoparticle inks on a glass substrate, scientists concluded that it was possible for them to control the production of print patterns to a scale of 2 microns. After printing, the nano-particle ink suspension was heated using a Gaussian laser; as it heated, the glass would expand due to the thermal conductivity of the gold nano-ink. In further experiments, they were able to fuse the nano-particles together into a tighter formation a continuous conductive line. Such experiments did not directly include font characters but could translate to such usage.

== See also ==
- Machine Identification Code
- Microdot
- Microfilmer
- Microform
- Microphotograph
- Point (typography)
- Preservation (library and archival science)
