= Microform =

Forms with microreproductions of documents

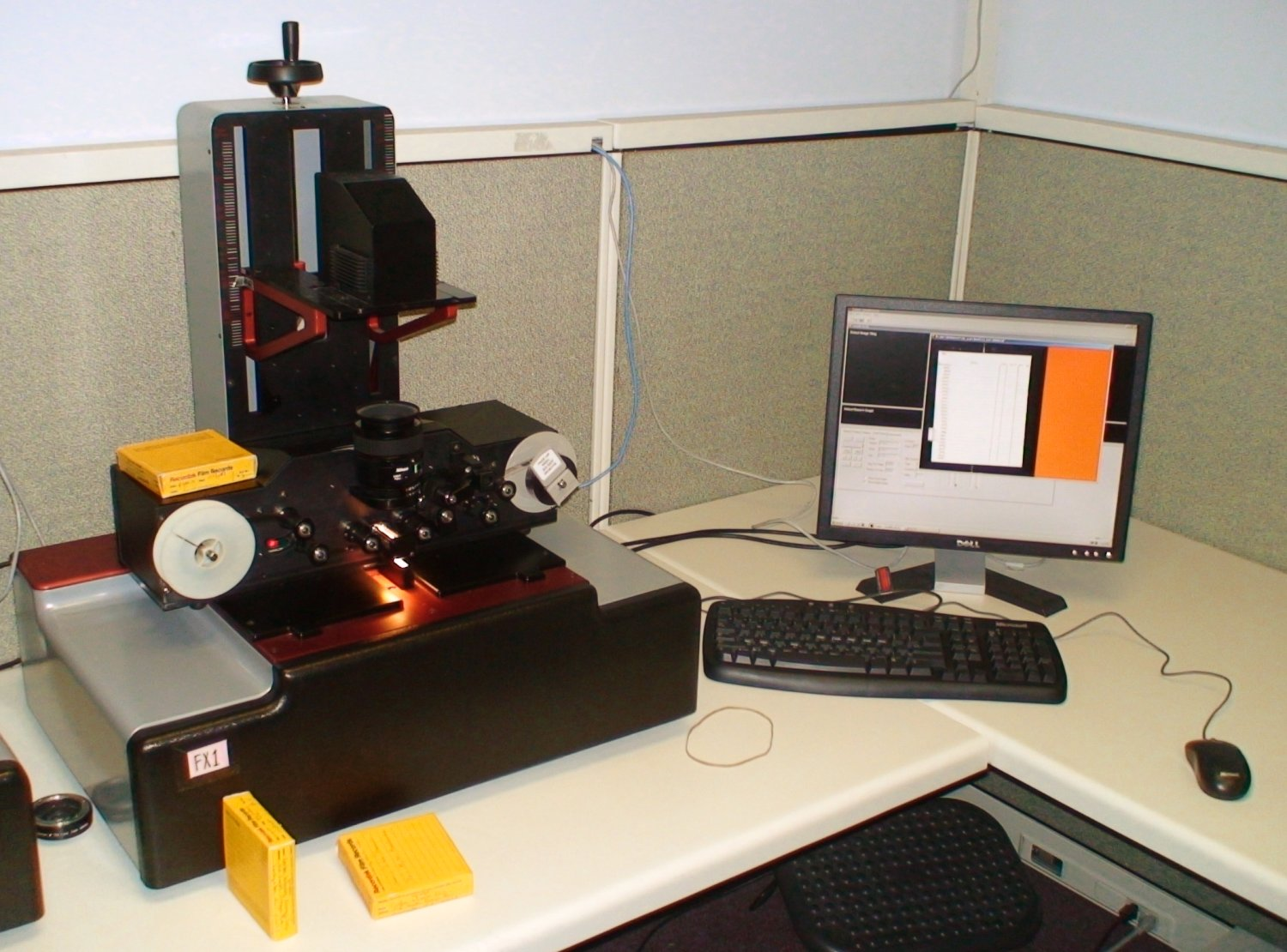
Digital scanning of microfilm

A microform is a scaled-down reproduction of a document made for the purposes of transmission, storage, reading, and printing. The original document is typically in the form of photographic film or paper. Four formats are common: microfilm (reels), microfiche (flat sheets), micro-opaques (like microcards), and aperture cards. In addition to filming from original paper documents, equipment is available that accepts a data stream from a computer and directly produces a microform.

John Benjamin Dancer was one of the first to produce microphotographs in 1839, using the daguerreotype process. Microphotography was first suggested as a document preservation method in 1851 by the astronomer James Glaisher, and in 1853 by John Herschel, another astronomer. Systems that mount microfilm images in punched cards have been widely used for archival storage of engineering information.

The medium has numerous features, including that it enables library users to access collections without putting rare, fragile, or valuable items at risk of theft or damage.

Desktop readers are boxes with a translucent screen at the front on to which is projected an image from a microform. A microfilm printer contains a xerographic copying process, like a photocopier. To create microform media, a planetary camera is mounted with the vertical axis above a copy that is stationary during exposure. Conversions may be applied to camera output or to release copies.

== Description ==
A scaled-down reproduction of a document is known as a microform. Typically, a microform is either photographic film or paper, and made for the purposes of transmission, storage, reading, and printing. Microform images are commonly reduced to 1/24 (about 4.2%) of the original document in each dimension, which is 1/576 in area. For higher storage density, greater optical reductions up to 200× (e.g. the Photo Chromic Micro-Image (PCMI) ultrafiches by NCR Company) may be used.

Three formats are common: microfilm (reels), microfiche (flat sheets), and aperture cards. Micro-opaques refer to a less-known format, similar to microfiche, but printed on cardboard rather than photographic film. Production of micro-opaques virtually ceased in the late 70s.

In addition to filming from original paper documents, equipment is available that accepts a data stream from a computer and directly produces a microform; the system exposes film to produce images as if the stream had been sent to a line printer and the listing had been microfilmed. The process is known as computer output microfilm or computer output microfiche (COM).

=== Types of microform media ===
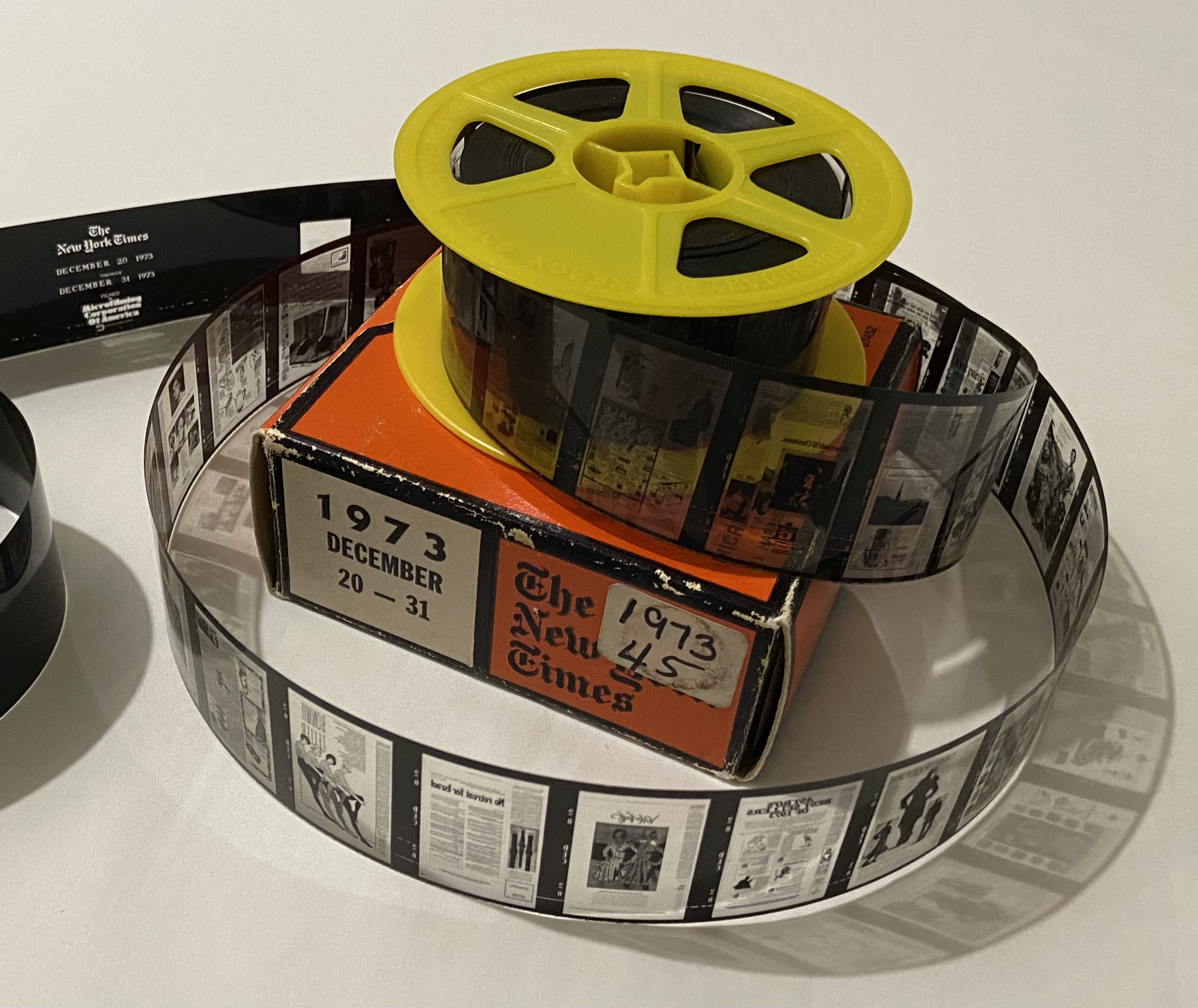
Positive 35mm 15X silver-gelatin microfilm reel

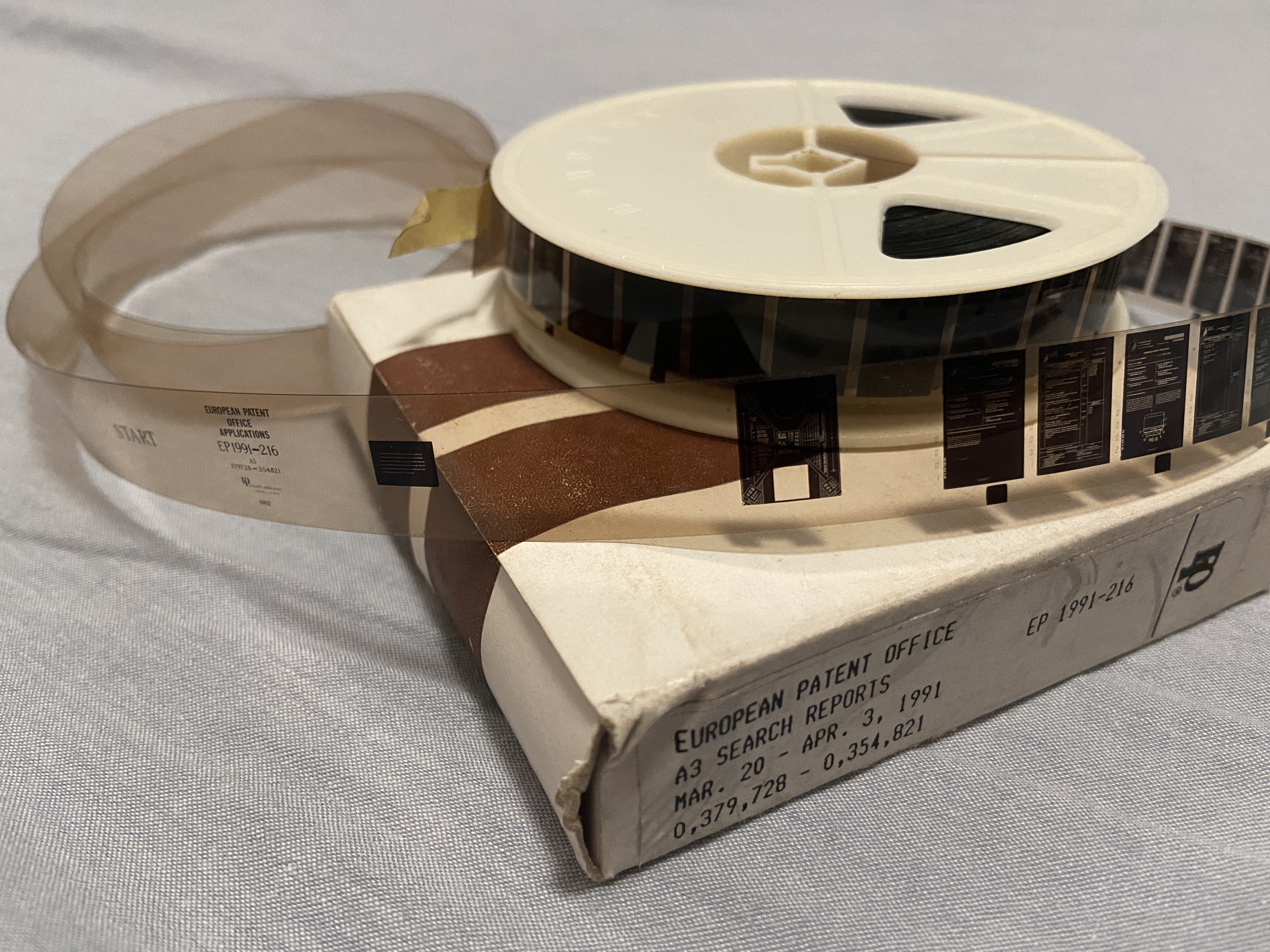
Negative 16mm 24X diazo microfilm reel

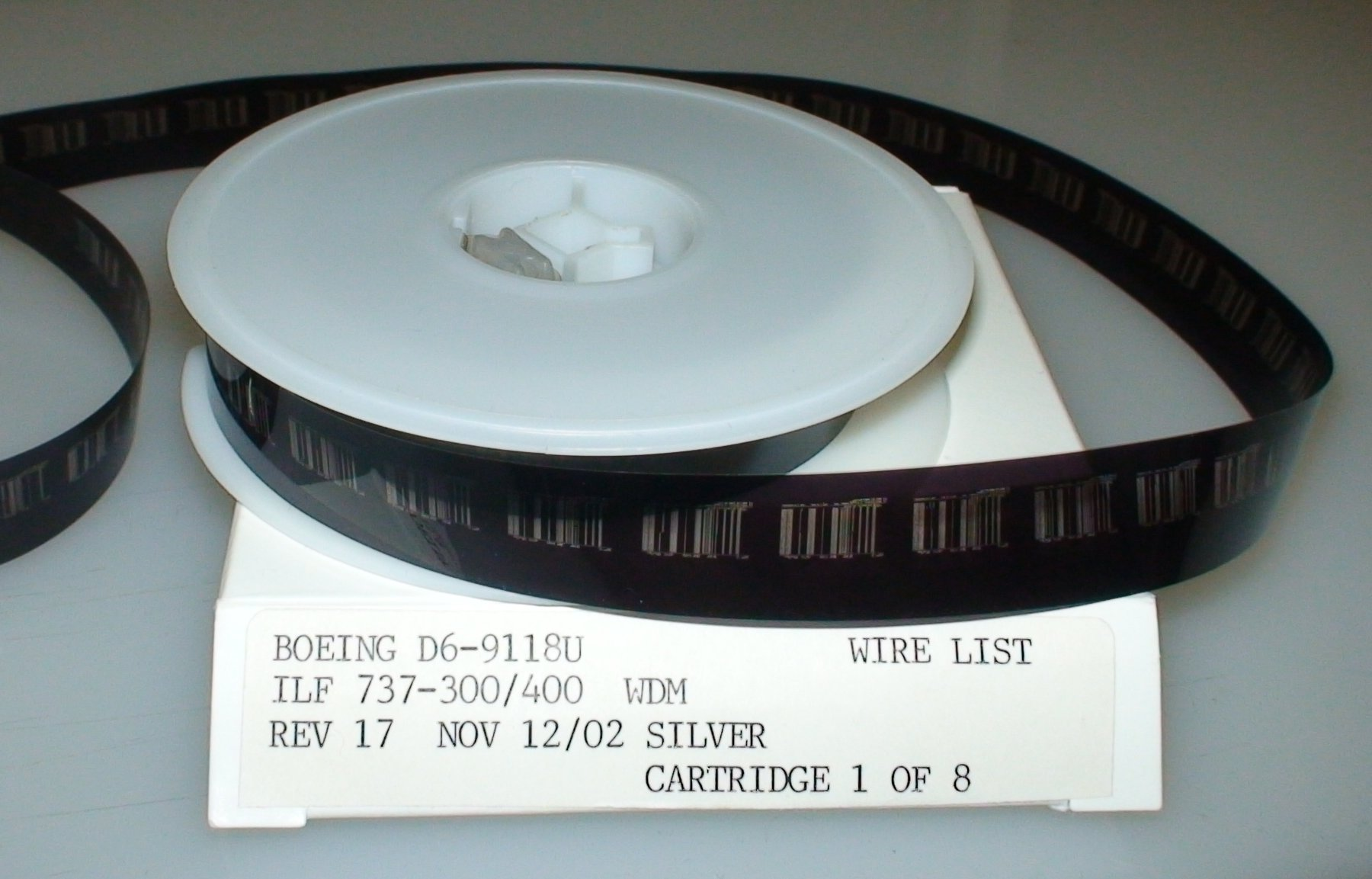
Negative 16mm COM microfilm reel

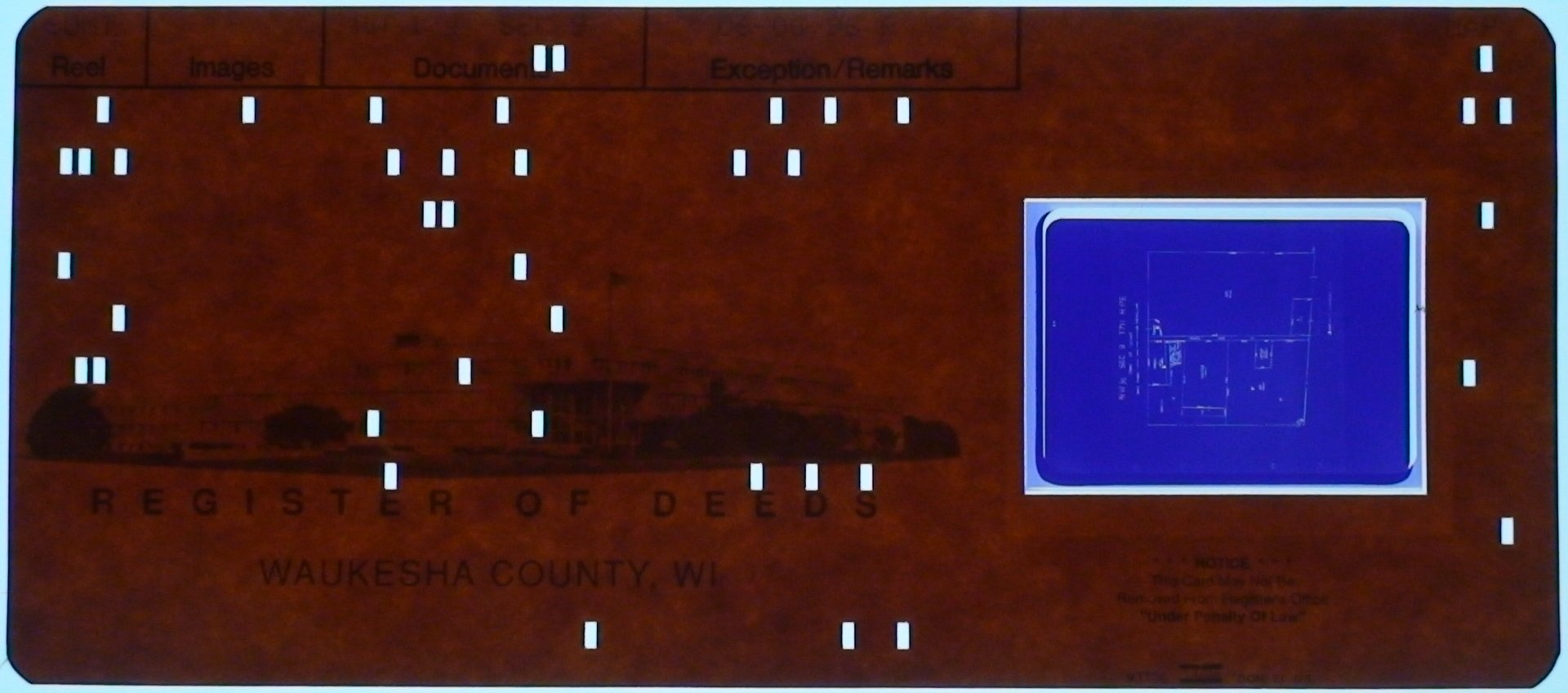
Aperture card with hollerith info

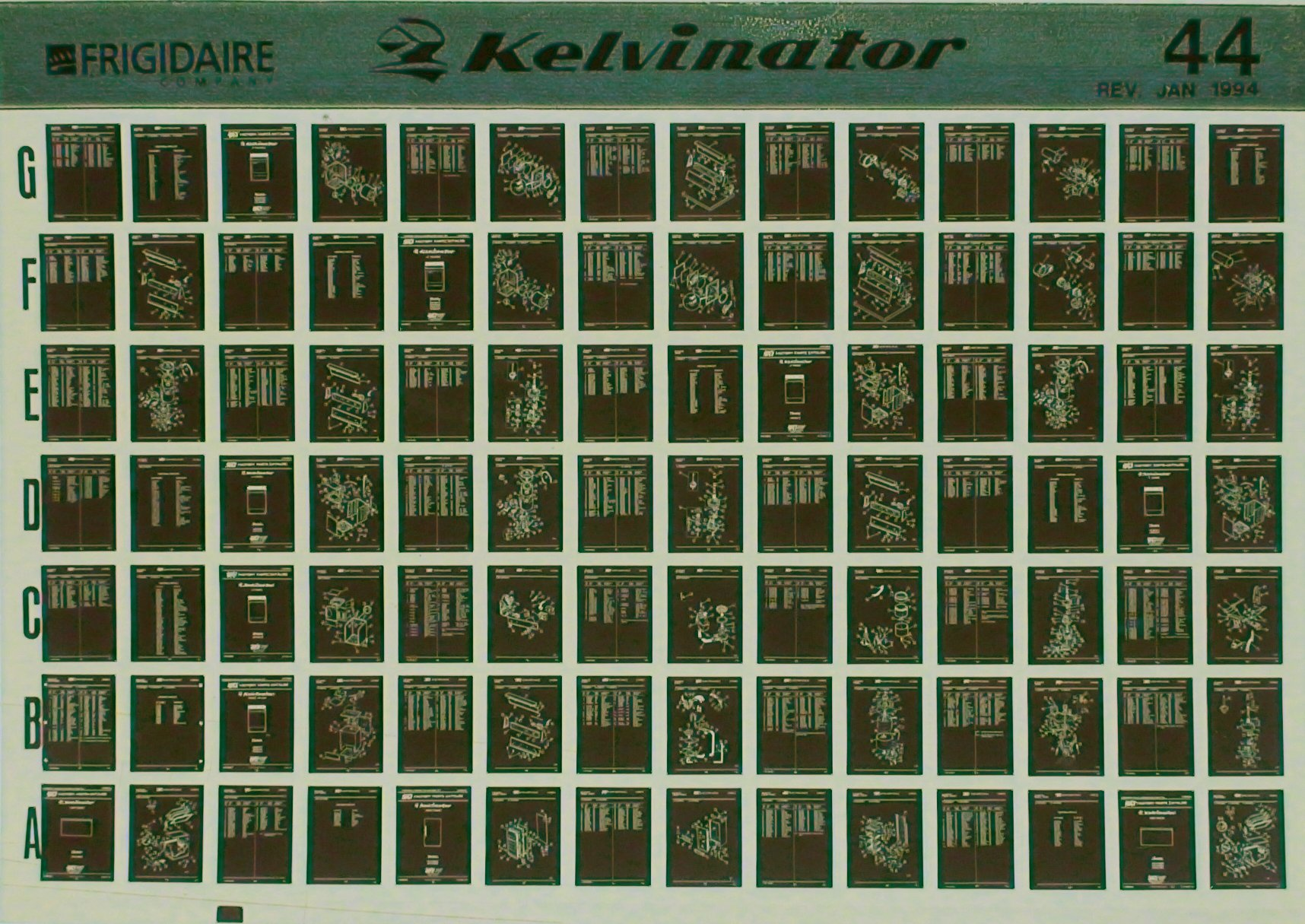
Duped jacket fiche

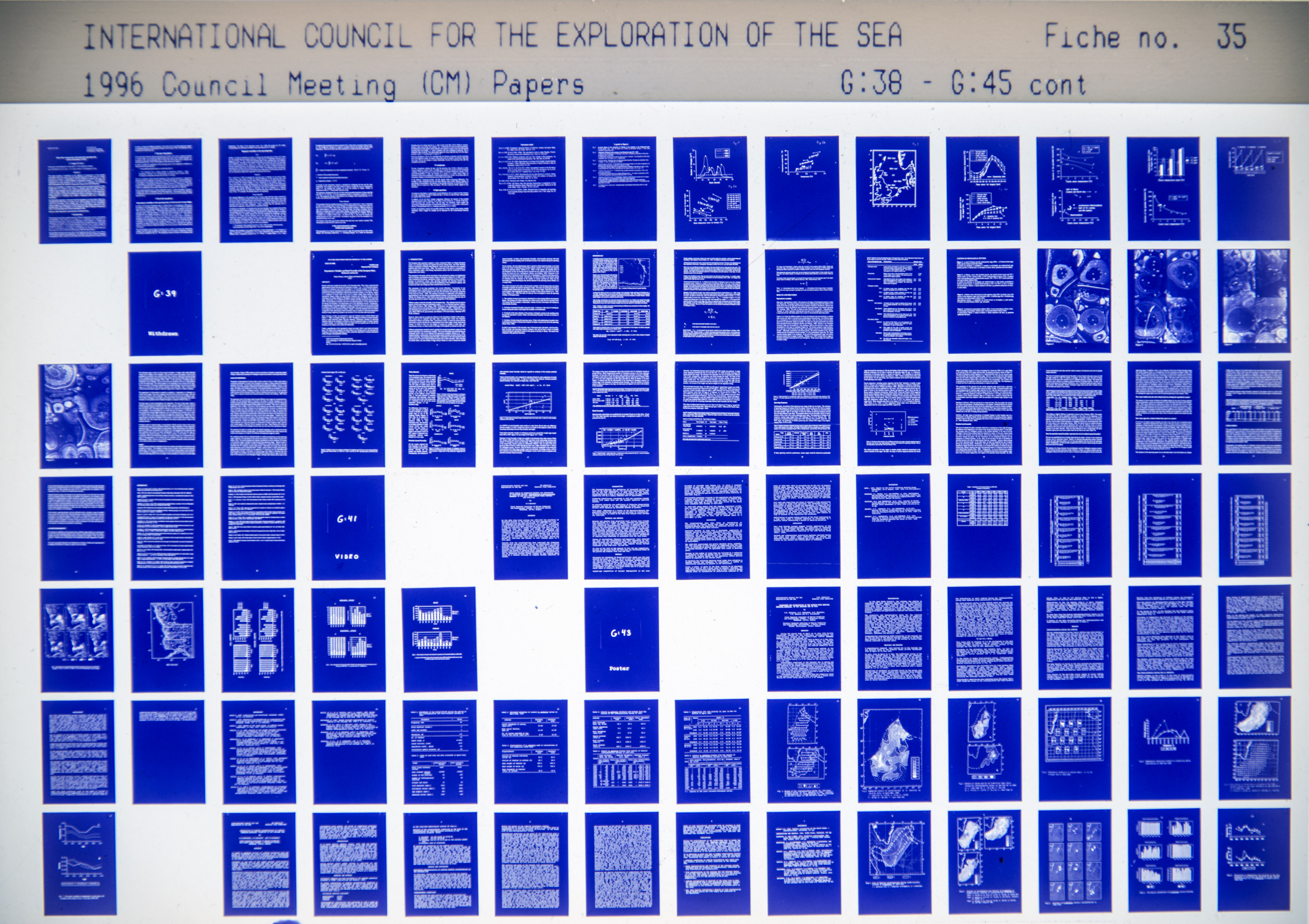
Negative diazo microfiche (24X, 98 frames)

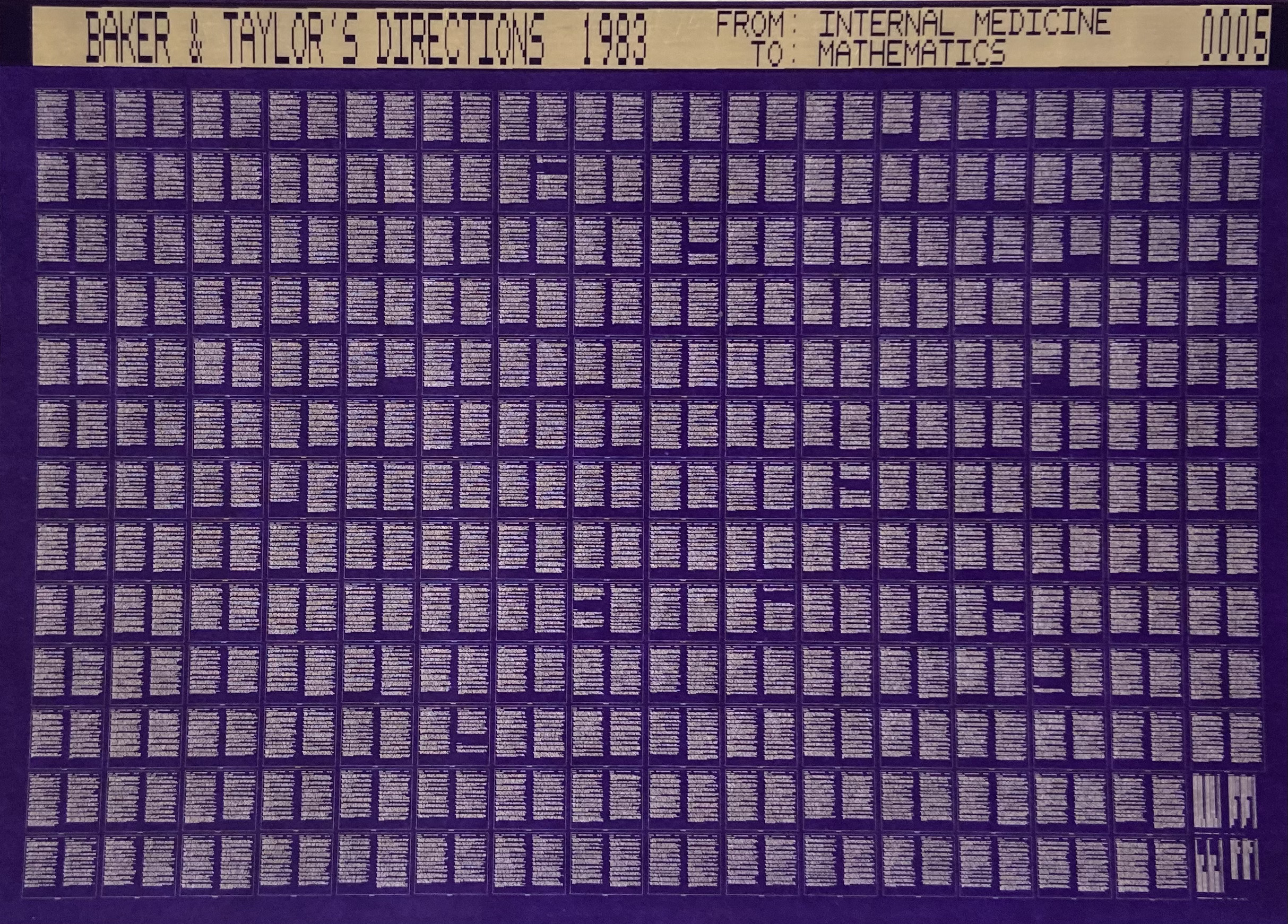
Typical COM diazo microfiche, nominal 48X reduction

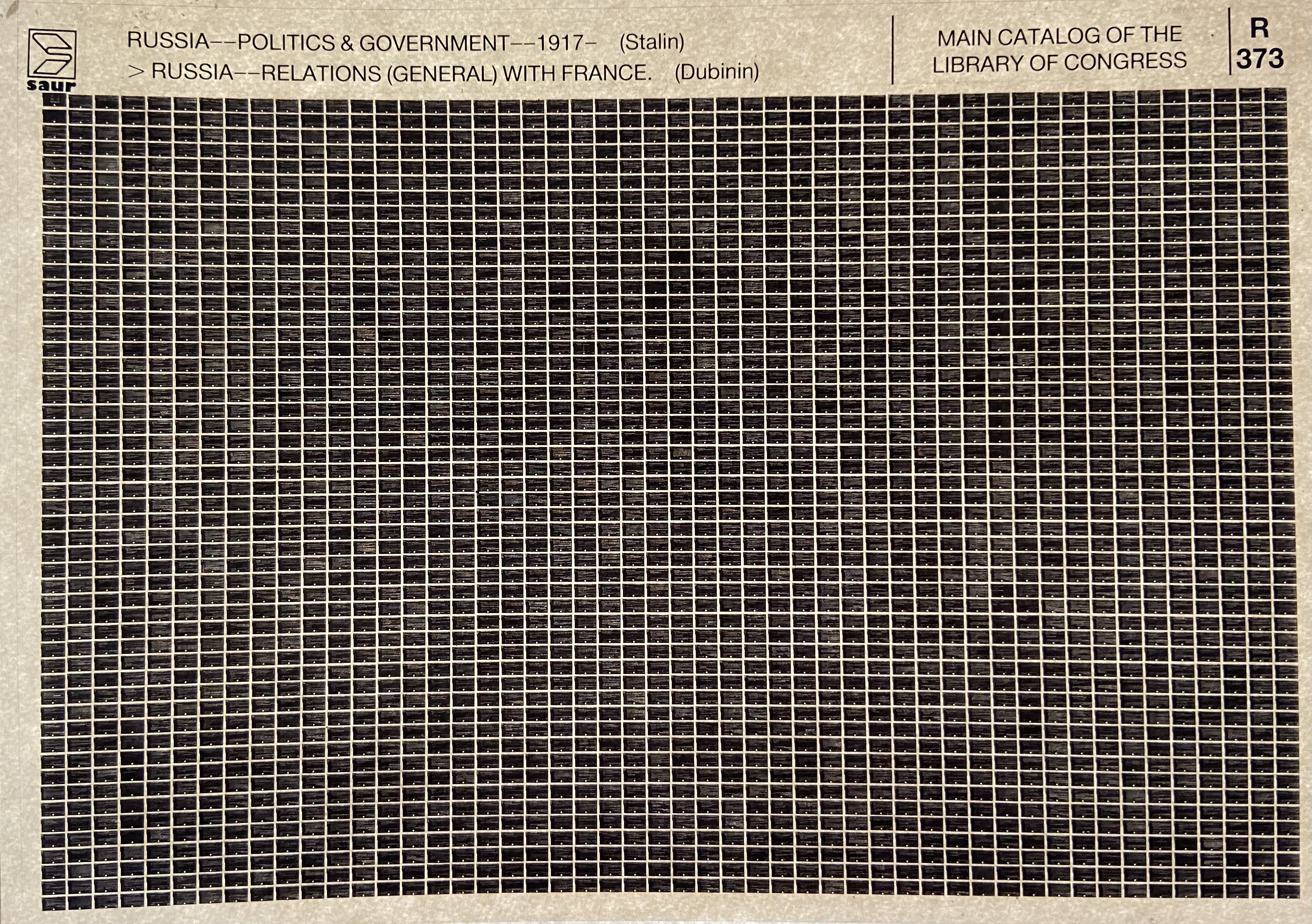
48X microfiche containing catalog cards

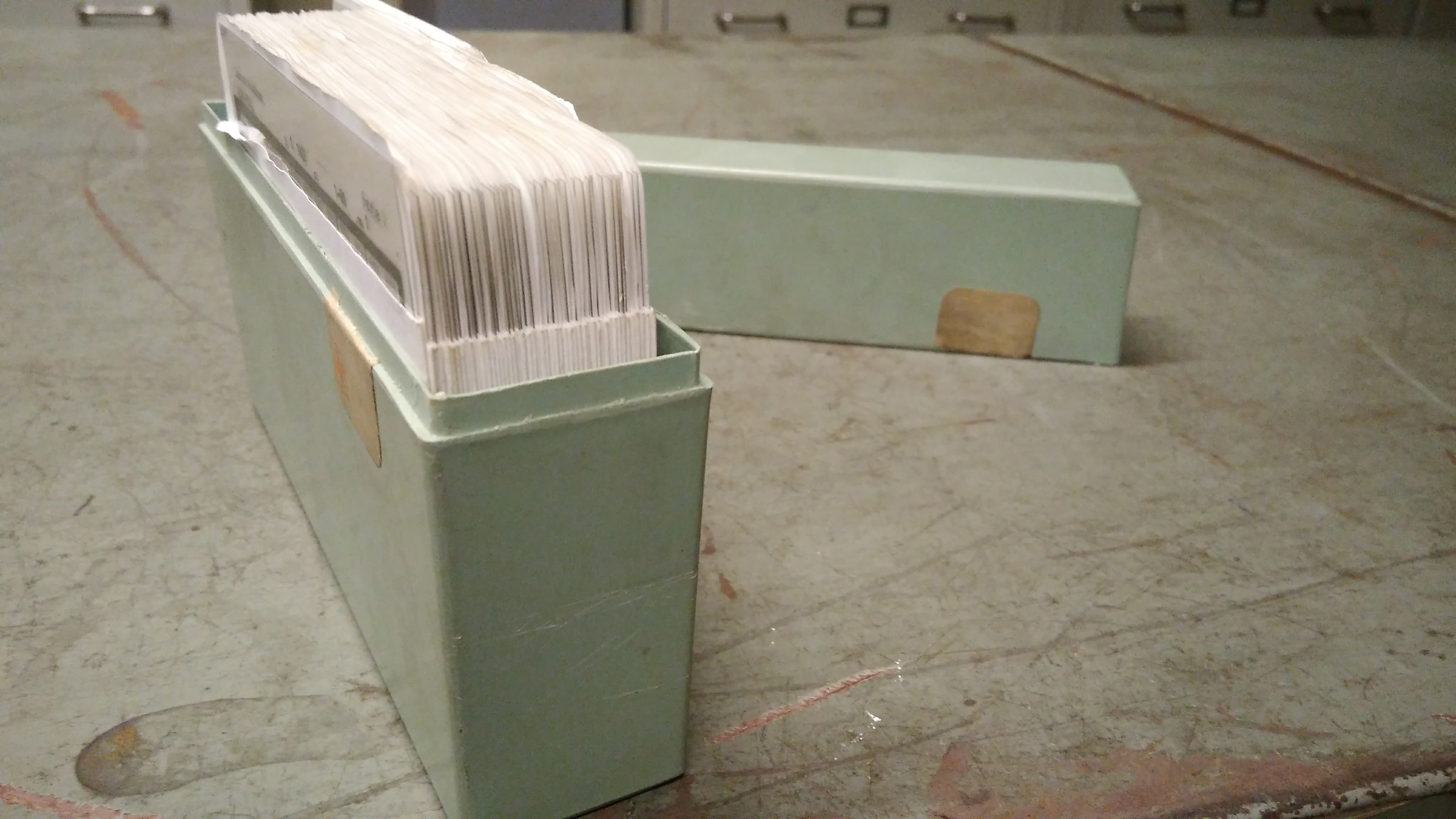
Microfiche holder with microfiches in paper sleeves

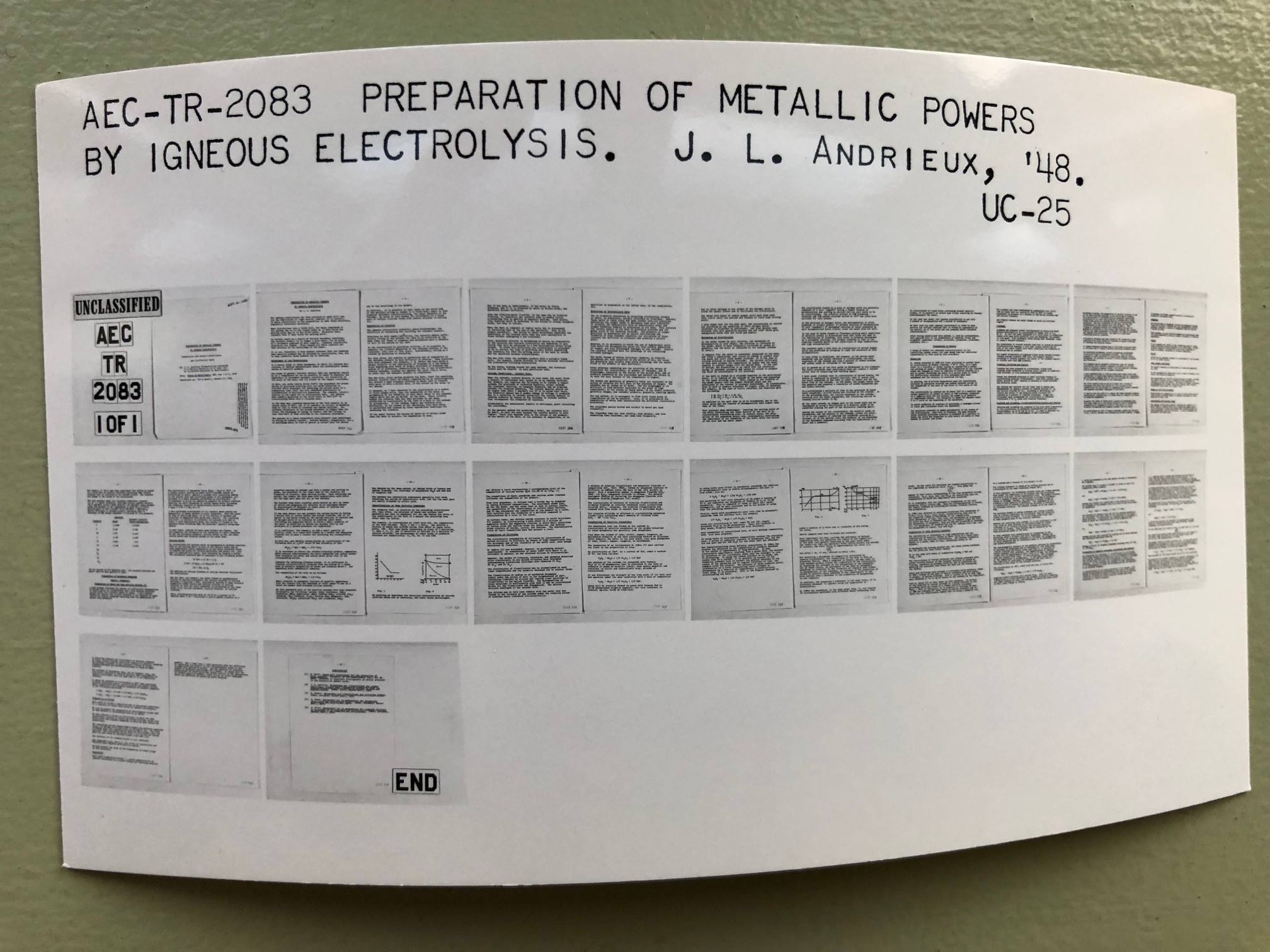
Microcard of an AEC report

==== Flat film ====
105 × 148 mm flat film is used for microimages of very large engineering drawings. These may carry a title photographed or written along one edge. Typical reduction is about 20, representing a drawing that is 2.0 × 2.8 m (79 × 110 in). These films are stored as microfiche.

==== Microfilm ====
16 mm or 35 mm film to motion picture standard is used, usually unperforated. Roll microfilm is stored on open reels or put into cartridges. The standard lengths for using roll film is 30.5 m (100 ft) rolls, and 100 ft, 130 ft or 215 ft for 16 mm rolls. One roll of 35 mm film may carry 600 images of large engineering drawings or 800 images of broadsheet newspaper pages. 16 mm film may carry 2,400 images of letter-sized images as a single stream of microimages along the film set so that lines of text are parallel to the sides of the film or 10,000 small documents, perhaps cheques or betting slips, with both sides of the originals set side by side on the film.

==== Aperture cards ====
Aperture cards are Hollerith cards into which a square opening has been cut. A 35 mm microfilm chip is mounted in the hole inside of a clear plastic sleeve or secured over the aperture with adhesive tape. They are used for engineering drawings in all engineering disciplines. There are libraries of these containing over 3 million cards. Aperture cards may be stored in drawers or in freestanding rotary units. The key-punched holes enable them to be readily sorted using computers.

==== Microfiche ====
A microfiche is a sheet of flat film, the most common and standard format is the National Microfilm Association (now Association for Intelligent Information Management) format which measures 105 × 148 mm in size (the same dimensions as the ISO A6 paper size) and utilize a reduction ratio of 24:1. It carries a matrix of microimages commonly read left-to-right and then top-to-bottom, while most COM microfiches are read from top to bottom, left to right. Most microfiches are read with the text parallel to the long side of the fiche, though some tables may be rotated 90 degrees requiring the use of the rotation mechanism of the reader (if present). Frames may be landscape or portrait in orientation. Along the top of the fiche is an eye-legible heading (sometimes with backing material to enhance contrast) carrying bibliographic information including fiche number, title, series, publish date, and publisher. The heading may also be color-coded to aid retrieval. The height of the banner varies with microfiche format and reduction ratio.

The most commonly used format for the contained microimages is a portrait image of about 10 × 14 mm. Office-size papers or magazine pages require a reduction of around 24:1 (in diameter). Microfiches may be stored in individual open-top envelopes. usually made of acid-free paper, which are put in drawers or boxes as file cards, or put into relatively big pockets and made to look like a book, or may be stored in specially-made binders with pages of pockets which show only the title bar of each fiche.

One special use case of microfiche is print-on-demand. When a researcher wishes to borrow a file on microfiche a copy is made on demand on diazo microfiche at very low cost. Thus the masterfiche never leaves the library and file integrity is guaranteed and the researcher can even build up a micro library at home in this way. However, this type of system obviously depends on the adequate provision of viewers.

==== Microfilm jackets ====
Microfilm jacket is a special form of microfiche, roll films (usually 16mm) are first produced, then cut up and loaded into strips or individual frames in channeled plastic envelopes. They are used for filing systems where there's a requirement to update individual files (say, personal records)

==== Ultrafiche ====
Ultrafiche (also ultramicrofiche) is an exceptionally compact version of a microfiche, storing analog data at much higher densities, (generally defined in the 70s as reduction rate higher than 90×). They are typically used for storing data gathered from extremely data-intensive operations, or for storing a book containing several thousands of pages on a single fiche. The "Microbook" Library of American Civilization, published by Library Resources Inc. (a subsidiary of Encyclopædia Britannica Inc.), used this degree of reduction to put more than 20,000 volumes on 3x5 inch ultrafiches, with each book occupying only one fiche and thus "unitized". In Britain, the British National Bibliography offered its Books in English service on ultrafiche at 150x with 2380 images per fiche. The development of ultrafiche is a breakthrough made possible by the development of a light-sensitive (photochromic) dye that is grain-less and light erasable. The PCMI micro-images are made first with photochromic dyes, then contact-printed onto a high-resolution photographic plate to make copies using conventional silver-halide film.

==== Micro-opaques ====
Micro-opaques are opaque, non-reversed formats and require specialized readers that projects them using reflected light. Few companies manufactured them, two of the most famous are Microcard Editions Inc. (Microcard) and Readex Corporation (Microprint), whose product names became synonymous with the medium. They were invented in 1948 by Fremont Rider and described in his book, The Scholar and the Future of the Research Library.

== History ==
Using the daguerreotype process, John Benjamin Dancer was one of the first to produce microphotographs, in 1839. He achieved a reduction ratio of 160:1. Dancer refined his reduction procedures with Frederick Scott Archer's wet collodion process, developed in 1850–51, but he dismissed his decades-long work on microphotographs as a personal hobby and did not document his procedures. The idea that microphotography could be no more than a novelty was an opinion shared in the 1858 Dictionary of Photography, which called the process "somewhat trifling and childish".

Microphotography was first suggested as a document preservation method in 1851 by the astronomer James Glaisher, and in 1853 by John Herschel, another astronomer. Both men attended the 1851 Great Exhibition in London, where the exhibit on photography greatly influenced Glaisher. He called it "the most remarkable discovery of modern times", and argued in his official report for using microphotography to preserve documents.

A pigeon post was in operation during the Siege of Paris (1870-1871). René Dagron photographed pages of newspapers in their entirety which he then converted into miniature photographs. He subsequently removed the collodion film from the glass base and rolled it tightly into a cylindrical shape which he then inserted into miniature tubes that were transported fastened to the tail feathers of the pigeons. Upon receipt the microphotograph was reattached to a glass frame and was then projected by magic lantern on the wall. The message contained in the microfilm could then be transcribed or copied. By 28 January 1871, when Paris and the Government of National Defense surrendered, Dagron had delivered 115,000 messages to Paris by carrier pigeon.

The chemist Charles-Louis Barreswil proposed the application of photographic methods with prints of a reduced size. The prints were on photographic paper and did not exceed 40 mm, to permit insertion in a goose-quill or thin metal tube, which protected against the elements. The pigeons each carried a dispatch that was tightly rolled and tied with a thread, and then attached to a tail feather of the pigeon. The dispatch was protected by being inserted in the quill, which was then attached to the tail feather.

The developments in microphotography continued through the next decades, but it was not until the turn of the century that its potential for practical usage was applied more broadly. In 1896, Canadian engineer Reginald A. Fessenden suggested microforms were a compact solution to engineers' unwieldy but frequently consulted materials. He proposed that up to 150,000,000 words could be made to fit in a square inch, and that a one-foot cube could contain 1.5 million volumes.

In 1906, Paul Otlet and Robert Goldschmidt proposed the livre microphotographique as a way to alleviate the cost and space limitations imposed by the codex format. Otlet's overarching goal was to create a World Center Library of Juridical, Social and Cultural Documentation, and he saw microfiche as a way to offer a stable and durable format that was inexpensive, easy to use, easy to reproduce, and extremely compact. In 1925, the team spoke of a massive library where each volume existed as master negatives and positives, and where items were printed on demand for interested patrons.

In the 1920s, microfilm began to be used in a commercial setting. New York City banker George McCarthy was issued a patent in 1925 for his "Checkograph" machine, designed to make micrographic copies of cancelled checks for permanent storage by financial institutions. In 1928, the Eastman Kodak Company bought McCarthy's invention and began marketing check microfilming devices under its "Recordak" division.

Between 1927 and 1935, the Library of Congress microfilmed more than three million pages of books and manuscripts in the British Library; in 1929 the Social Science Research Council and the American Council of Learned Societies joined to create a Joint Committee on Materials for Research, chaired for most of its existence by Robert C. Binkley, which looked closely at microform's potential to serve small print runs of academic or technical materials. In 1933, Charles C. Peters developed a method to microformat dissertations, and in 1934 the United States National Agriculture Library implemented the first microform print-on-demand service, which was quickly followed by a similar commercial concern, Science Service.

In 1935, Kodak's Recordak division began filming and publishing The New York Times on reels of 35 millimeter microfilm, ushering in the era of newspaper preservation on film. This method of information storage received the sanction of the American Library Association at its annual meeting in 1936, when it officially endorsed microforms.

In 1937 Herman H. Fussler of the University of Chicago set up an exhibition of microform at the World Congress of Universal Documentation.

Harvard University Library was the first major institution to realize the potential of microfilm to preserve broadsheets printed on high-acid newsprint and it launched its "Foreign Newspaper Project" to preserve such ephemeral publications in 1938. Roll microfilm proved far more satisfactory as a storage medium than earlier methods of film information storage, such as the Photoscope, the Film-O-Graph, the Fiske-O-Scope, and filmslides.

The year 1938 also saw another major event in the history of microfilm when University Microfilms International (then called University Microfilms) was established by Eugene Power. For the next half century, UMI would dominate the field, filming and distributing microfilm editions of current and past publications and academic dissertations. UMI was first acquired by Xerox and later Bell & Howell in the 90s. Eventually UMI was made a part of ProQuest Information and Learning in 2001.

Micrographics came into its own in the 1960s during which decade the micrographic industry became a $500 million/year business. Also in the 1960s, the development of micrographic technology and computer data processing permitted the output of computers to be exposed directly on film, which is called COM.

The use of microforms in libraries took up momentum in the late 60s. In 1974 UNESCO included microform in their Bibliographical Services Throughout the World questionnaire for the first time, but at that time the bibliographical control of microforms was not adequate.

== Uses ==
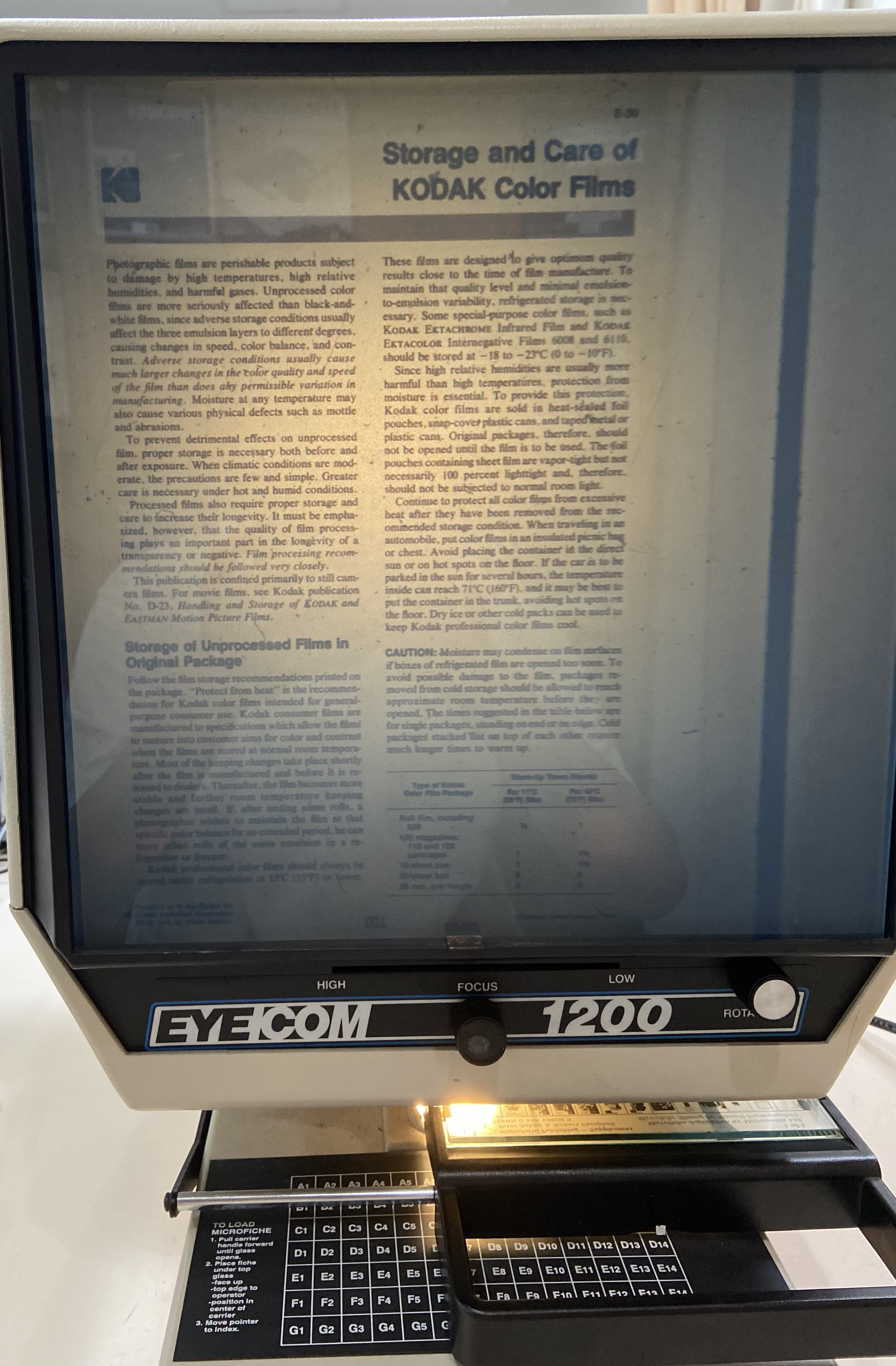
An EYECOM 1200 microfiche reader projecting a standard 24X microfiche containing kodak technical publications. Note the brightness "hot spot" at the center that was a common complaint concerning back-projection readers. The lamp is in need of replacement, giving light that is yellower and dimmer than normal.

Systems that mount microfilm images in punched cards have been widely used for archival storage of engineering information.

For example, when airlines demand archival engineering drawings to support purchased equipment (in case the vendor goes out of business, for example), they normally specify punch-card-mounted microfilm with an industry-standard indexing system punched into the card. This permits automated reproduction, as well as permitting mechanical card-sorting equipment to sort and select microfilm drawings.

Aperture card mounted microfilm is roughly 3% of the size and space of conventional paper or vellum engineering drawings. Some military contracts around 1980 began to specify digital storage of engineering and maintenance data because the expenses were even lower than microfilm, but these programs are now finding it difficult to purchase new readers for the old formats.

Microfilm first saw military use during the Franco-Prussian War of 1870–71. During the Siege of Paris, the only way for the provisional government in Tours to communicate with Paris was by pigeon post. As the pigeons could not carry paper dispatches, the Tours government turned to microfilm. Using a microphotography unit evacuated from Paris before the siege, clerks in Tours photographed paper dispatches and compressed them to microfilm, which were carried by homing pigeons into Paris and projected by magic lantern while clerks copied the dispatches onto paper.

Additionally, the US Victory Mail, and the British "Airgraph" system it was based on, were used for delivering mail between those at home and troops serving overseas during World War II. The systems worked by photographing large amounts of censored mail reduced to thumb-nail size onto reels of microfilm, which weighed much less than the originals would have. The film reels were shipped by priority air freight to and from the home fronts, sent to their prescribed destinations for enlarging at receiving stations near the recipients, and printed out on lightweight photo paper. These facsimiles of the letter-sheets were reproduced about one-quarter the original size and the miniature mails were then delivered to the addressee. Use of these microfilm systems saved significant volumes of cargo capacity needed for war supplies. An additional benefit was that the small, lightweight reels of microfilm were almost always transported by air, and as such were delivered much more quickly than any surface mail service could have managed.

Libraries began using microfilm in the mid-20th century as a preservation strategy for deteriorating newspaper collections. Books and newspapers that were deemed in danger of decay could be preserved on film and thus access and use could be increased. Microfilming was also a space-saving measure. In his 1945 book, The Scholar and the Future of the Research Library, Fremont Rider calculated that research libraries were doubling in space every sixteen years. His suggested solution was microfilming, specifically with his invention, the microcard. Once items were put onto film, they could be removed from circulation and additional shelf space would be made available for rapidly expanding collections. The microcard was superseded by microfiche. By the 1960s, microfilming had become standard policy.

In 1948, the Australian Joint Copying Project started; the intention to film records and archives from the United Kingdom relating to Australia and the Pacific. Over 10,000 reels were produced, making it one of the largest projects of its kind.

Around the same time, Licensed Betting Offices in the UK began using microphotography as a means of keeping compact records of bets taken. Betting shop customers would sometimes attempt to amend their betting slip receipt to attempt fraud, and so the microphotography camera (which also generally contained its own independent time-piece) found use as a definitive means of recording the exact details of each and every bet taken. The use of microphotography has now largely been replaced by digital 'bet capture' systems, which also allow a computer to settle the returns for each bet once the details of the wager have been 'translated' into the system by an employee. The added efficiency of this digital system has ensured that there are now very few, if indeed any, betting offices continuing to use microfilm cameras in the UK.

Visa and National City use microfilm (roll microfilm and fiche) to store financial, personal, and legal records.

In the mid-70s, practically all major automobile manufacturers worldwide transitioned to issuing their active spare part documentation (even repair manuals) on microform instead of looseleaf binders within a span of few years. Additions and updates were provided by reissuing (cumulative) indexes and occasional complete replacement of the entire catalog in microform. Completeness and file integrity is assured and misfiling is prevented. Many other industries have also adopted microform as the medium of internal information services to keep sales and service departments provided with up-to-date product information and technical documentation. Among them is the computer industry in which microform is used for the distribution of programming and service information.

In the 1970s and 1980s, some books included a few microfiches in back pockets to accommodate a lengthy appendix. Of those included were (among others) statistics, computer programs, maps, archival materials, and photographs.

== Characteristics ==
The medium has numerous characteristics:

- It enables libraries to access collections without putting rare, fragile, or valuable items at risk of theft or damage.
- It enables highly compact storage of information, with far smaller storage costs than paper documents. An NMA (National Micrographics Association) standard 4x6 inch microfiche records 98 typical document size pages reduced at 24× arranged in a grid of 7x14. This common arrangement is called "NMA Type I". A 4"x6" COM microfiche records information equivalent to 240 report pages reduced in a typical ratio of 48X. When compared to filing paper, microforms can reduce space storage requirements by up to 95%.
- It is cheaper to distribute than paper copy if users have related equipment to access those images. Most microfiche services get a bulk discount on reproduction rights, and have lower reproduction and carriage costs than a comparable amount of printed paper. This is dependent on the current price of film and postage as well as end user equipment availability for the needs required. This is why courts specify the printed image from film and not the film itself. The US Supreme Court, since Nov 2017, has shown a preference to a PDF/A digital submittal over analog images.
- It is a relatively stable archival form when properly processed and stored. Preservation standard microfilms use the silver halide process, creating silver images in hard gelatin emulsion on a acetate base. When properly produced, developed according to archival standards, and stored in appropriate, albeit difficult to maintain, storage conditions, this film has a life expectancy of ≈500 years. However, when temperature and humidity levels are greater than required a number of things often happen. When relative humidity is over 60%, fungus spores will settle and grow on the gelatin, eventually decomposing it and making it water-soluble. The acetate base of the film degrades into acetic acid under non-ideal conditions, causing what is known as vinegar syndrome. Redox is the oxidation of the surface of the film and is often found in higher humidity areas. Regardless of temperature, blemishes (REDOX) appear on film and are caused by oxidation of materials stored with or near film. Diazo-based systems with lower archival lives (<20 years) which have polyester or epoxy bases are generally used as a means to duplicate and distribute film to a broader number of users because they are not polarity-reversing and duplicates can be cheaply created from silver masters. Diazo films use light-sensitive dyes that fade under adverse conditions, just a couple of hours left in the reader with the lamp on is enough to make a diazo microfiche fade to unreadable condition.
- The principal disadvantage of microforms is that the image is (usually) too small to read with the naked eye and requires analog or digital magnification to be read.
- Reader machines used to view microform (especially microfilm reels) are often expensive, heavy, difficult to learn, and require regular servicing like lamp replacing. Reading on machines can cause eye-strain when used for prolonged periods especially when the focus is not sharp, uniform and stable or the acutance of the image is poor. Unless some kind of automatic-retrieval system like blip-coding or Kodak's MIRACODE is implemented, users must carefully wind and rewind the microfilm reel until they find the page they wanted. However, odometers and flash cards inserted on film can accelerate this process.
- Because microfilm emulsions are usually single-layered and high resolving power (also low turbidity, high acutance) is prioritized over continuous tone quality, the emulsion used in microforms usually have very steep gamma and low dynamic range. Thus continuous-tone photographs and illustrations reproduce poorly in microform especially in shadow details. This inherent bi-tonal nature of microfilm limits its ability to convey much subtlety of tone even when scanned in gray scale using the latest digital viewer-scanners. Half-tone pictures (like those found on The New York Times) are not affected provided that the mesh count used to produce the image is low and the film stock has the ability to reproduce fine lines and small dots well.
- Specially designed reader-printers or enlarger-printers are not always available, limiting the user's ability to make copies for their own purposes. Microfiches have the advantage in this regard as being able to be duplicated on diazo or vesicular film at almost nominal price per fiche.
- Color microfirm is expensive and have lower resolution than silver-gelatin microfilm, thus discouraging most micropublishers and libraries from producing color films. Before the advent of non-fading color film (like ILFOCHROME MICROGRAPHICS FILM), the color photographic dyes used to print color microforms will fade over long term unless put in deep freeze. These factors results in a relatively low usage of color microforms, leading to loss of information for users as color materials can only be obtained in black and white. The lack of quality and color images in microfilm, when libraries were discarding paper originals, was a major impetus to Bill Blackbeard and other comic historians' work to rescue and maintain original paper archives of color pages from the history of newspaper comics. Many non-comics color images were not targeted by these efforts and were lost.
- When stored in the highest-density drawers, it is easy to misfile a fiche, which is thereafter unavailable to patrons and can be considered lost. As a result, some libraries store microfiche in a restricted area and retrieve it on demand while microfilm reels may be open-shelf and self-serviced.
- Like all analog media formats, microforms is lacking in features enjoyed by users of digital media. Analog copies degrade with each generation by about 10% in definition, while some digital copies have much higher copying fidelity. Digital data can also be indexed and searched easily without relying on a paper or on-line index.
- While security is often cited as an advantage of microforms in relevant literature in the 1970s, it is not uncommon to find microforms accidentally mutilated, damaged or lost/stolen(especially microfiches). Users can easily tear, scratch microforms either because of underserviced machines or lack of care in handling. Most damage to film is caused through general use where readers' glass guides and dirt will often scratch or cause abrasion to the emulsion, jam film in carriers and otherwise damage film through user mishandling. Microforms generally suffer more wear and tear in normal use than paper.
- Since it is analog image (an image of the original data), it is viewable with mild magnification. Unlike digital media, the format requires no software to decode the data stored thereon. It is comprehensible to persons literate in the written language; the only equipment that is needed is a device to magnify the image appropriately (in the case of low to medium reduction microfiche, a high-powered magnifying glass is all that is necessary). Some feel that microforms are simpler to use because an image can be seen with a loupe or other small device.
- Prints from microfilm are accepted in legal proceedings as surrogates for original documents but require reader/printers to convert images back to paper. Nearly all of the analog reader printer manufactures have discontinued production and support of these units in favor of digital reproduction.
- Microfilm can be digitally converted and distributed to a very large number of users at the same time with little or no added cost to the users. Digital microfilm or Computer Output Microfilm is often created from digital surrogates so there are both digital and analog images providing for a very secure backup and the ability to use the images without risk of damaging the film.

== Readers and printers ==
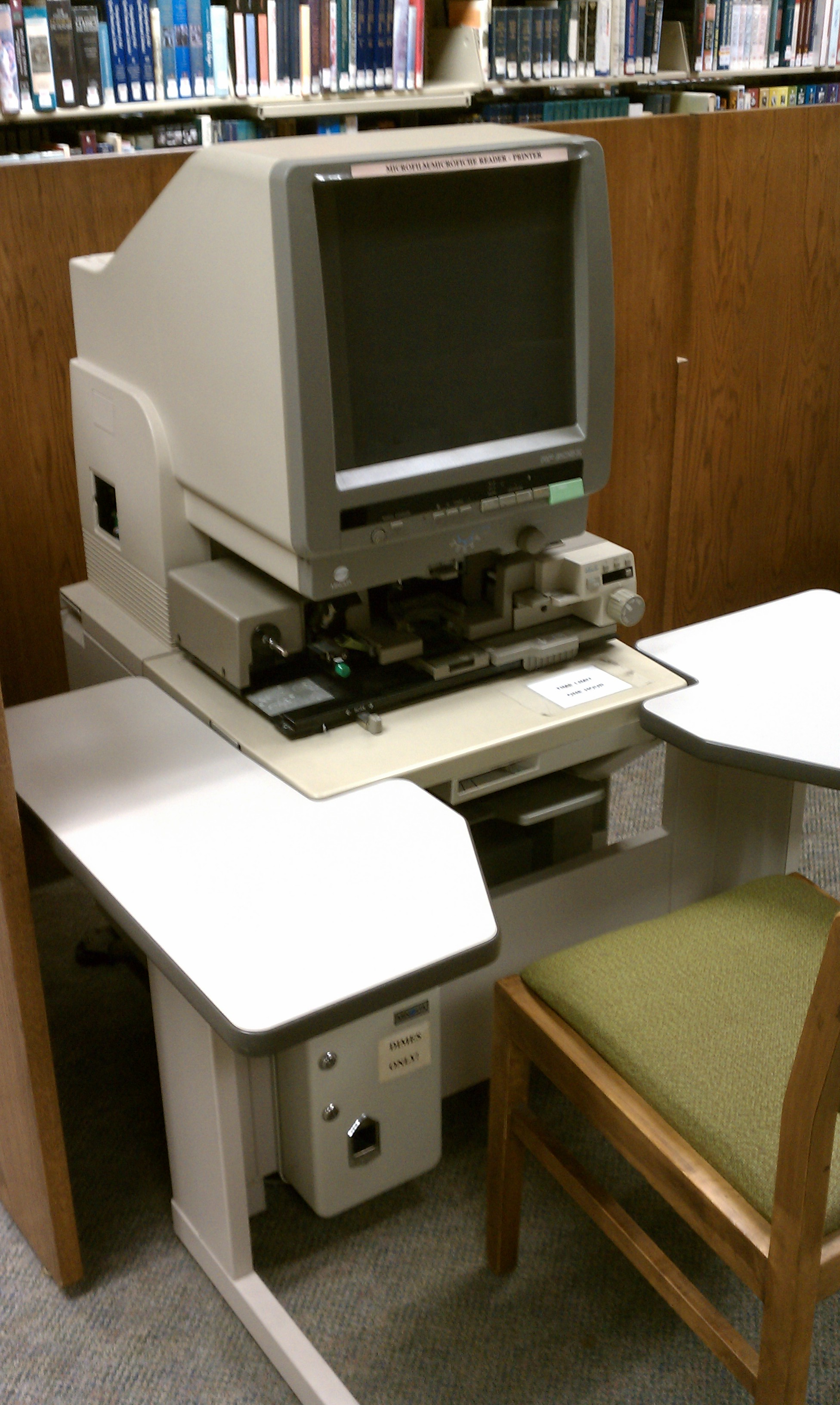
A microfiche reader-printer in a library

Desktop readers are boxes with a translucent screen at the front on to which is projected an image from a microform. They have suitable fittings for whatever microform is in use. They may offer a choice of magnifications. They usually have motors to advance and rewind film. When coding blips are recorded on the film a reader is used that can read the blips to find any required image.

Portable readers are plastic devices that fold for carrying; when open they project an image from microfiche on to a reflective screen. For example, with M. de Saint Rat, Atherton Seidell developed a simple, inexpensive ($2.00 in 1950), monocular microfilm viewing device, known as the "Seidell viewer", that was sold during the 1940s and 1950s.

A microfilm printer contains a xerographic copying process, like a photocopier. The image to be printed is projected with synchronised movement on to the drum. These devices offer either small image preview for the operator or full size image preview, when it is called a reader printer. Microform printers can accept positive or negative films and positive or negative images on paper. New machines allow the user to scan a microform image and save it as a digital file.

== Image creation ==
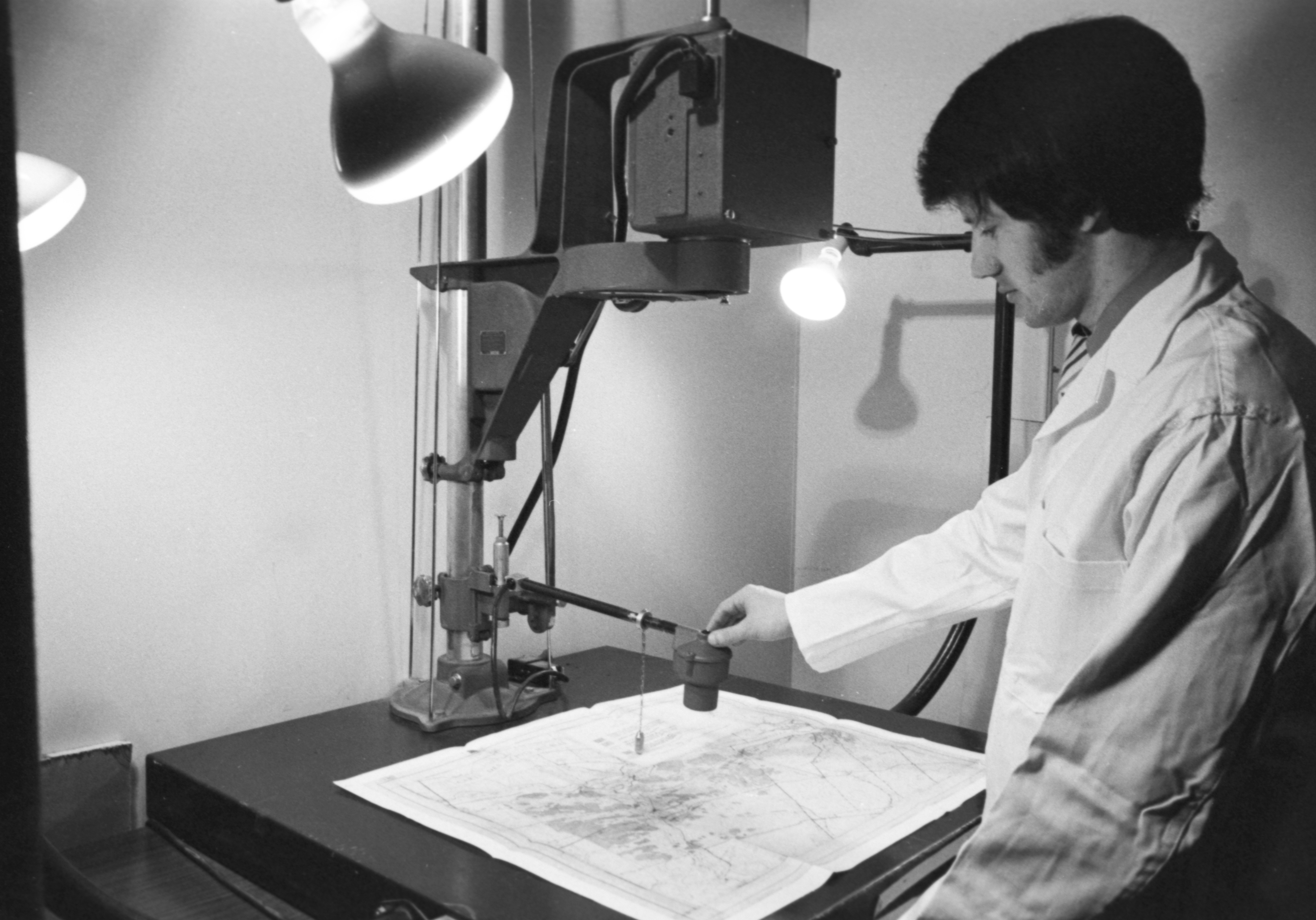
35 mm microfilming station: positioning of the light meter for adjusting the camera exposure

To create microform media, a planetary camera is mounted with the vertical axis above a copy that is stationary during exposure. High volume output is possible with a rotary camera which moves the copy smoothly through the camera to expose film which moves with the reduced image. Bound volumes, however, have to be disintegrated into loose leaves to be able to be fed into the rotary camera. Alternatively, it may be directly produced using computers, i.e. COM (computer output microfilm).

=== Film ===
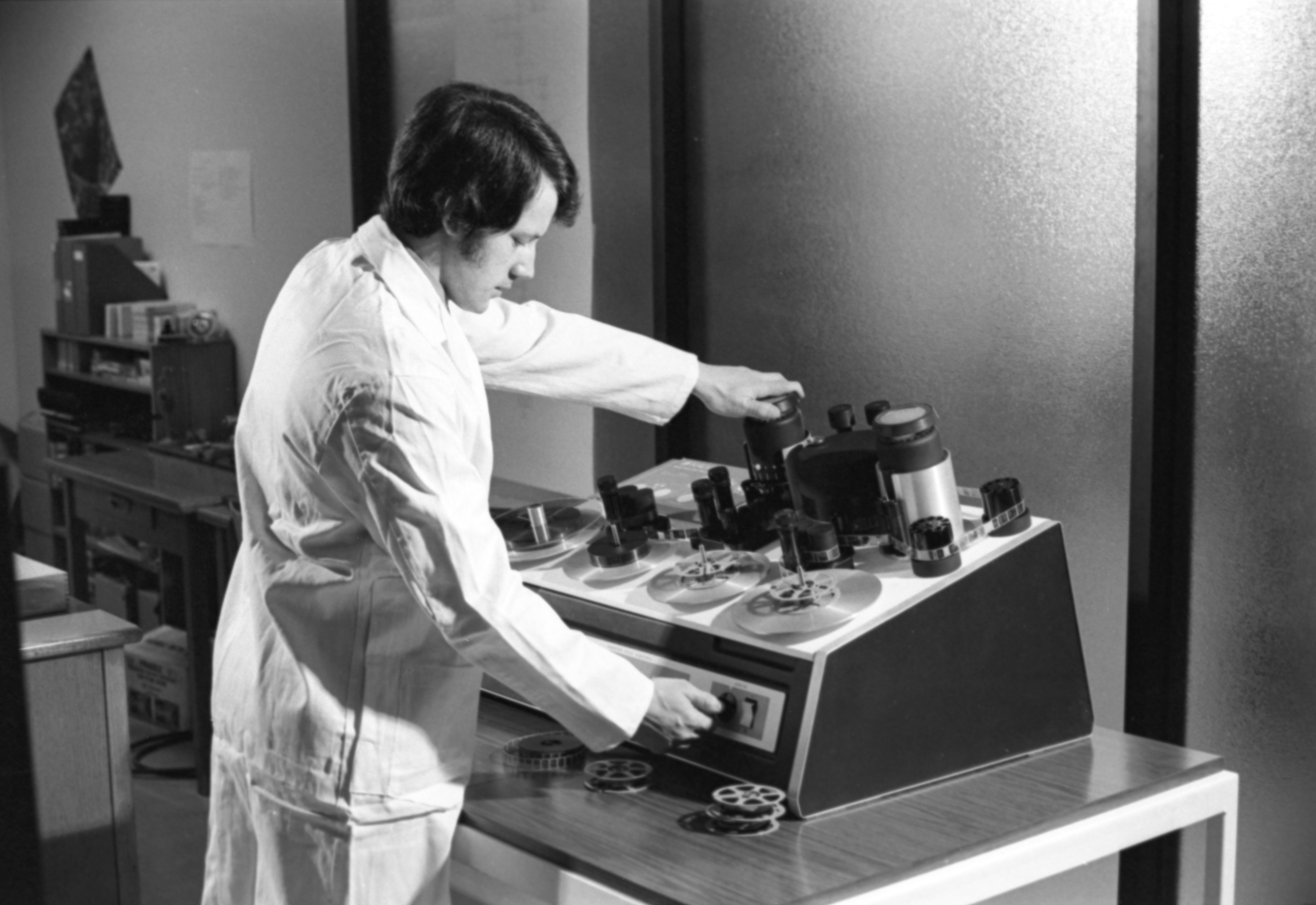
Production and duplication of 16 and 35 mm microfilms

While many ultra-high resolution plates and lithographic film are orthochromatic (even blue-sensitive), microfilming primarily uses high resolution panchromatic monochrome film stock. Color microfilm exist but are limited in resolving power compared to black and white film and can only be used at moderate reduction ratios. Roll film is provided 16, 35 and 105 mm wide in lengths of 30 metres (100 ft) and longer, and is usually unperforated. Roll film is developed, fixed and washed by continuous processors.

Early cut sheet microforms and microfilms (to the 1930s) were printed on nitrate film, which poses high risks to their holding institutions, as nitrate film is chemically unstable and a fire hazard. From the late 1930s to the 1980s, microfilms were usually printed on a cellulose acetate base, which is prone to tears, vinegar syndrome, and redox blemishes. Vinegar syndrome is the result of chemical decay and produces "buckling and shrinking, embrittlement, and bubbling". Redox blemishes are yellow, orange or red spots 15–150 micrometres in diameter created by oxidative attacks on the film, and are largely due to poor storage conditions.

=== Cameras ===
The simplest microfilm camera that is still in use is a rail mounted structure at the top of which is a bellows camera for 105 x 148 mm film. A frame or copy board holds the original drawing vertical. The camera has a horizontal axis which passes through the center of the copy. The structure may be moved horizontally on rails. In a darkroom a single film may be inserted into a dark slide or the camera may be fitted with a roll film holder which after an exposure advances the film into a box and cuts the frame off the roll for processing as a single film.

For engineering drawings, a freestanding open steel structure is often provided. A camera may be moved vertically on a track. Drawings are placed on a large table for filming, with centres under the lens. Fixed lights illuminate the copy. These cameras are often over 4 metres (13 ft) high. These cameras accept roll film stock of 35 or 16 mm. For office documents a similar design may be used but bench standing. This is a smaller version of the camera described above. These are provided either with the choice of 16 or 35 mm film or accepting 16 mm film only. Non adjustable versions of the office camera are provided. These have a rigid frame or an enveloping box that holds a camera at a fixed position over a copy board. If this is to work at more than one reduction ratio there are a choice of lenses. Some cameras expose a pattern of light, referred to as blips, to digitally identify each adjacent frame. This pattern is copied whenever the film is copied for searching.

A camera is built into a box. In some versions this is for bench top use, other versions are portable. The operator maintains a stack of material to be filmed in a tray, the camera automatically takes one document after another for advancement through the machine. The camera lens sees the documents as they pass a slot. Film behind the lens advances exactly with the image. Special purpose flow cameras film both sides of documents, putting both images side by side on 16 mm film. These cameras are used to record cheques and betting slips.

All microfiche cameras are planetary with a step and repeat mechanism to advance the film after each exposure. The simpler versions use a dark slide loaded by the operator in a dark room; after exposure the film is individually processed, which may be by hand or using a dental X-ray processor. Cameras for high output are loaded with a roll of 105 mm film. The exposed film is developed as a roll; this is sometimes cut to individual fiche after processing or kept in roll form for duplication.

=== Computer output microform ===
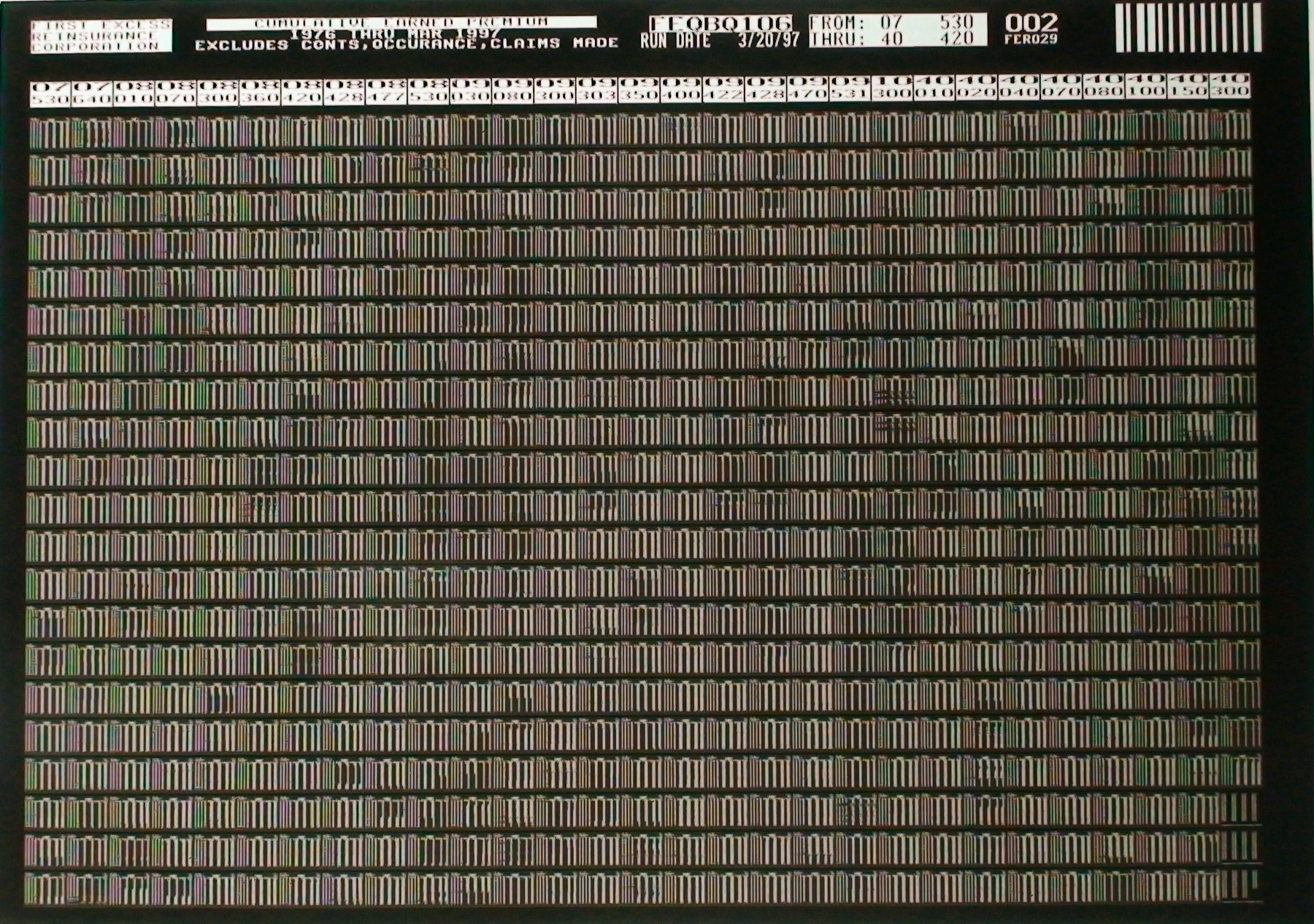
Computer output microfiche card

Equipment is available that accepts a data stream from a mainframe computer. This exposes film to produce images as if the stream had been sent to a line printer and the listing had been microfilmed. Because of the source one run may represent many thousands of pages. The process is known as computer output microfilm or computer output microfiche (COM).

Within the equipment character images are made by a light source; this is the negative of text on paper. COM is sometimes processed normally. Other applications require that image appears as a conventional negative; the film is then reversal processed. This outputs either 16 mm film or fiche pages on a 105 mm roll.

Because listing characters are a simple design, a (typical) reduction ratio of 48x gives good quality and puts about 400 pages on a microfiche. A microfilm plotter, sometimes called an aperture card plotter, accepts a stream that might be sent to a computer pen plotter. It produces corresponding frames of microfilm. These produce microfilm as 35 or 16 mm film or aperture cards.

Computer Output Microfiche was used to distribute massive amounts of frequently changed data to institutions or companies which could not afford computer terminals but already used microfiche readers for a variety of reasons. In some cases the quantities involved justified getting a microfiche reader just to read COM fiche.

The first COM devices date back to around 1955 and were used in scientific programming as substitutes for paper-based plotters. Then during the 1960s, business applications sought to use COM. This was part of the effort to find alternatives to paper-based reports in dealing with the information explosion. By 1969, some of the scientific users of COM included Bell Telephone Laboratories, the MIT Lincoln Laboratory, and NASA, while some of the business users included The Equitable Life Assurance Society, Sears Roebuck & Company, and the Social Security Administration.

Besides connecting directly to a computer, a COM device could also connect to a magnetic tape drive for a form of off-line operation. Making use of this approach, throughout the mainframe era there were a number of service bureaus offering COM capabilities.

In 1972, the IEEE journal Computer pronounced COM as "one of the more significant developments in the information systems business". Microfiche was the most common output form used by COM applications. And by the early 1970s there were a score of relatively inexpensive microfiche readers on the market, and individuals could purchase ones as well.

There were two alternative technological approaches in early COM systems. The first kind, known as CRT systems, involved the computer data being converted to analog voltages and sent to a cathode-ray tube, whereupon the image would be captured by a microfilm camera; systems of this kind generally used the Kodak Recordak brand's Dacomatic film, types 5461 or 7461. These systems would require photographic chemicals to process the film. The second kind, known as EBR systems, involved using electron beam recording to directly create images onto dry-silver film; systems of this kind used 3M Computer Film, type 761.

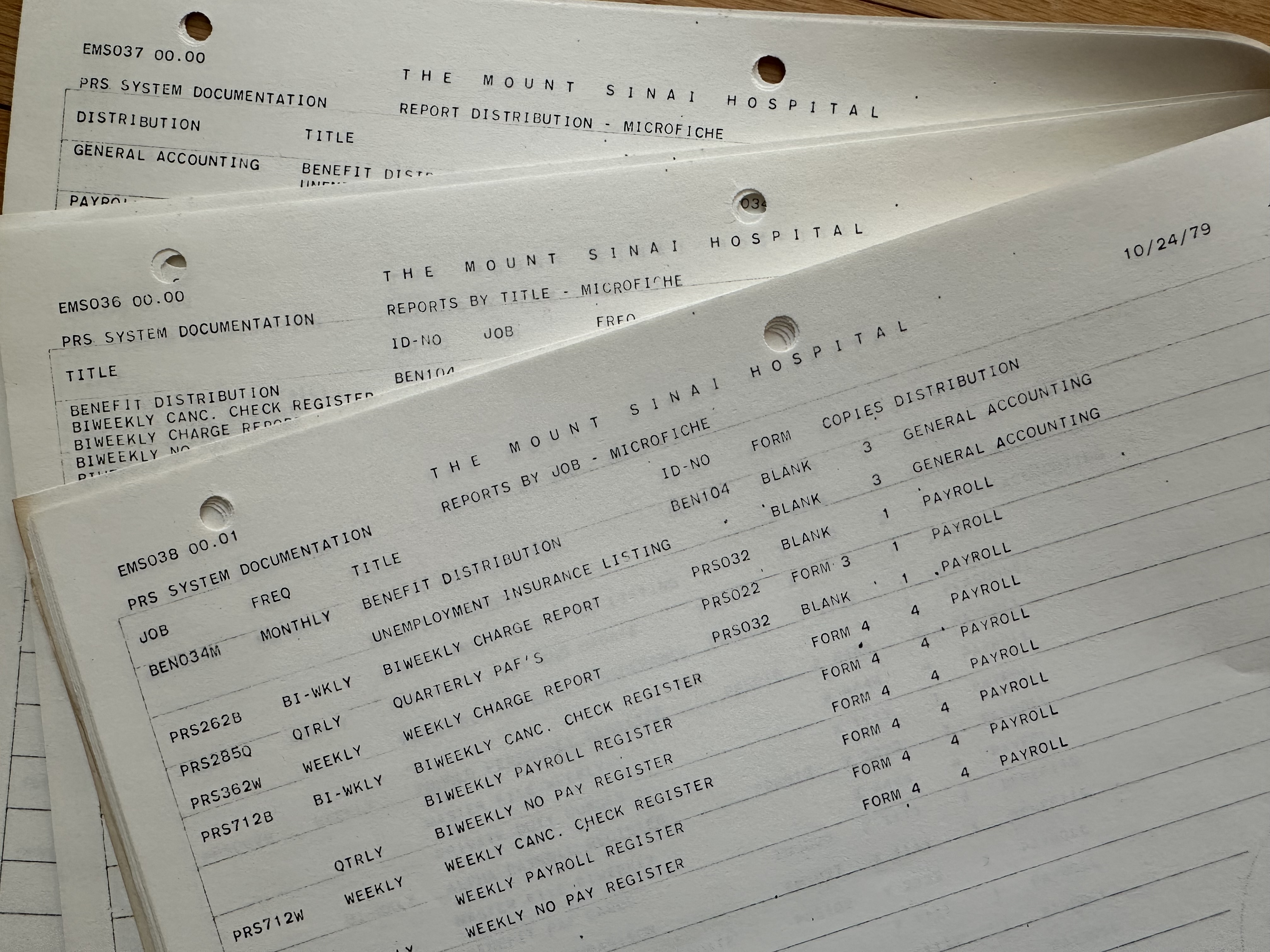
The Mount Sinai Medical Center in New York was a heavy user of COM for microfiche; here a 1979 listing of some of their payroll and general accounting reports being distributed that way.

Over the years, vendor leadership in the COM and microfilming domains generally consisted of the Eastman Kodak Company, the 3M Company, and the Bell & Howell Company. Also important in COM products were DatagraphiX, Inc. and Quantor Corporation.

Initially, wet-chemical-based products dominated the COM market. According to an analysis by International Data Corporation, as of 1976 the leading COM vendor was DatagraphiX, with a 30 percent market share. Four vendors split most of the rest of the market, each with a share between 14 and 17 percent: 3M, Bell & Howell, Kodak, and Quantor. These systems would sometimes face customer resistance: Kodak's KOM 90 offering was a wet-solution system that some customers did not want to bring into raised-floor computer rooms for fear the processing chemicals would leak out and damage wiring and cabling underneath the floor. Some sites using wet-chemical COM devices kept the machine in a separate room and the chemicals in still another separate area.

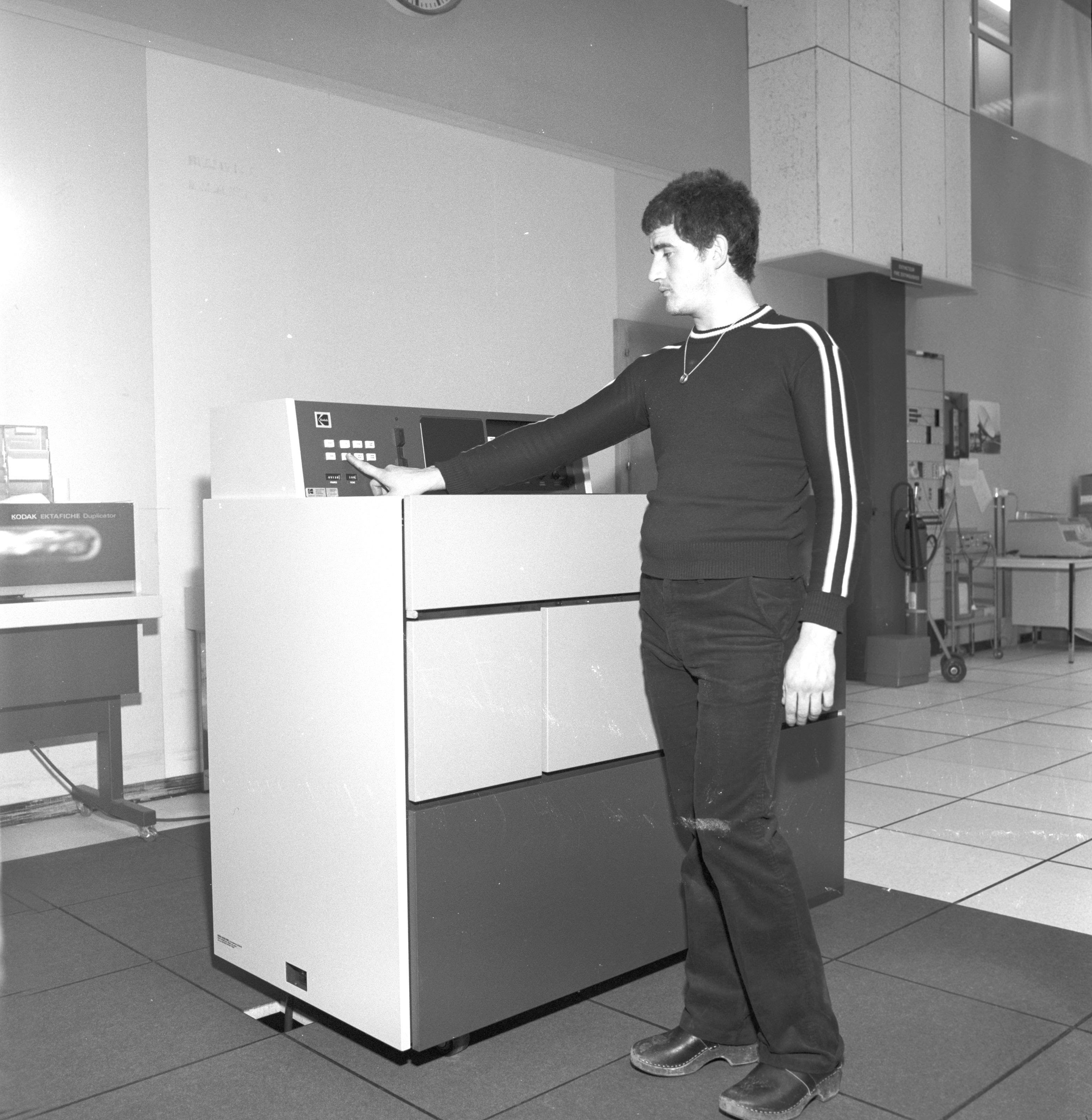
A Kodak Komstar system in use at CERN in Geneva in 1981

New technology emerged when COM systems employing a laser beam and a dry processing approach came onto the market in the mid-late-1970s, with Bell & Howell and Kodak concentrating on that approach, while DatagraphiX and Quantor tended to stay with, and try to improve, wet-chemical methods. In 1977, Eastman Kodak introduced the laser-beam, dry-processing Kodak Komstar product line, which consisted of the models 100, 200, and 300, and made use of Kodak's new Recordak Dacomatic DL SO-030 film Compared to earlier COM products, the laser and dry processing approach was attractive to customers. One site using the Komstar 200 was The Mount Sinai Medical Center in New York, which printed around 190,000 frames of data per month; it reported immediate cost savings of 33 percent as well as improved ease of operation and space utilization.

By the early 1980s, Bell & Howell had three COM products, the 3700, 3800, and 3900. Quantor had been bought by NCR Corporation, and its COM solutions were put out under the NCR brand; these included the Q115 and Q118. And DatagraphiX remained active.

An industry survey published by Infosystems magazine in 1981 indicated that around half of all corporate data processing departments were using COM, with most of those making use of a service bureau rather than doing it in-house. In some regions, however, the COM service bureau business model struggled to succeed.

COM equipment was often used together with computer aided retrieval (CAR) systems. Use of CAR was considered part of a complete information management capability. Such systems included Kodak's KAR-8800, as well as Bell & Howell's Excalibur product as well as offerings from several smaller companies.

During the mid-1980s, the microimaging industry had 5 to 6 percent growth per annum. Over the next several years, the industry would be characterized as mature and featuring low growth.

By the early 1990s, computer output to laser disc (COLD) was becoming a replacement technology. Sales of COM units went into a steep decline. Later still, computer output went to CD-R and DVD-R media.

== Duplication ==
All regular microfilm copying involves emulsion-to-emulsion contact exposure under pressure. Then the film is processed to provide a permanent image. Hand copying of a single fiche or aperture card involves exposure over a light box and then individually processing the film. Roll films are contact exposed via motor, either round a glass cylinder or through a vacuum, under a controlled light source. Processing may be in the same machine or separately.

Silver halide microfilm is a variant of camera film with fine grain, thin emulsion and high resolving power. It is suitable for prints or for use as an intermediate from which further prints may be produced. The result is usually a negative copy. Preservation standards require a master negative, a duplicate negative, and a service copy (positive). Master negatives are kept in deep storage, and duplicate negatives are used to create service copies, which are the copies available to researchers. This multi-generational structure ensures the preservation of the master negative.

Diazo-sensitised film for dye coupling in ammonia gives non-polarity-reversing copies with dye colors in blue, brown, magenta, or black (by combining blue and brown). The black or brown image film can be used for further copying, while the blue dye images may have insufficient UV density to make satisfactory copies.

Vesicular film is sensitised with a diazo dye, which after exposure is developed by heat. Where light has come to the film remains clear, in the areas under the dark image the diazo compound is destroyed quickly, releasing millions of minute bubbles of nitrogen into the film. This produces an image by diffusing light away where the bubbles reside. This property makes it possible to vary its density by changing the aperture of the microfiche reader. It has very steep gamma and is the only microfilm technology that requires pre-exposure to lower the contrast. It produces a good black appearance in a reader, but it cannot be used for further copying.

Modern microfilming standards require that a master set of films be produced and set aside for safe storage, used only to make service copies. When service copies get lost or damaged, another set can be produced from the masters, thus reducing the image degradation that results from making copies of copies.

== Format conversion ==
Conversions may be applied to camera output or to release copies. Single microfiche are cut from rolls of 105 mm film. A bench top device is available that enables an operator to cut exposed frames of roll film and fit these into ready made aperture cards.

Transparent jackets are made A6 size each with six pockets into which strips of 16 mm film may be inserted (or fewer pockets for 35 mm strips), so creating microfiche jackets or jacketed microfiche. Equipment allows an operator to insert strips from a roll of film. This is particularly useful as frames may be added to a fiche at any time. The pockets are made using a thin film so that duplicates may be made from the assembled fiche.

Another type of conversion is microform to digital. This is done using an optical scanner that projects the film onto a CCD array and captures it in a raw digital format. Until early in the 21st century, since the different types of microform are dissimilar in shape and size, the scanners were usually able to handle only one type of microform at a time. Some scanners would offer swappable modules for the different microform types. The latest viewer/scanner can accept any microform (roll, fiche, opaque cards, fiche, or aperture cards). Software in an attached PC is then used to convert the raw capture into a standard image format for immediate or archival uses.

The physical condition of microfilm greatly impacts the quality of the digitized copy. Microfilm with a cellulose acetate base (popular through the 1970s) is frequently subject to vinegar syndrome, redox blemishes, and tears, and even preservation standard silver halide film on a polyester base can be subject to silvering and degradation of the emulsion—all issues which affect the quality of the scanned image.

Digitizing microfilm can be inexpensive when automated scanners are employed. The Utah Digital Newspapers Program has found that, with automated equipment, scanning can be performed at $0.15 per page. Recent additions to the digital scanner field have brought the cost of scanning down substantially so that when large projects are scanned (millions of pages) the price per scan can be pennies.

Modern microform scanners utilize 8-bit gray shade scanning arrays and are thus able to provide high quality scans in a wealth of different digital formats: CCITT Group IV which is compressed black and white (bitonal), JPEG which is gray or color compression, bitmaps which are not compressed, or a number of other formats such LZW, GIF, etc. These modern scanners are also able to scan at "Archival" resolution up to or above 600 dpi.

For the resulting files to be useful, they must be organized in some way. This can be accomplished in a variety of different ways, dependent on the source media and the desired usage. In this regard, aperture cards with Hollerith information are probably the easiest since image data can be extracted from the card itself if the scanner supports it. Often, the digital image produced is better than the visual quality available prescan. Some types of microfilm will contain a counter next to the images; these can be referenced to an already existing database. Other microfilm reels will have a 'blip' system: small marks next to the images of varying lengths used to indicate document hierarchy (longest: root, long: branch, short: leaf). If the scanner is able to capture and process these then the image files can be arranged in the same manner. Optical character recognition (OCR) is also frequently employed to provide automated full-text searchable files. Common issues that affect the accuracy of OCR applied to scanned images of microfilm include unusual fonts, faded printing, shaded backgrounds, fragmented letters, skewed text, curved lines and bleed through on the originals. For film types with no distinguishing marks, or when OCR is impossible (handwriting, layout issues, degraded text), the data must be entered in manually, a very time-consuming process.

== See also ==
- Microdot – Steganograph method of hiding messages
- Microfilm reader – Device used to project and magnify images in microform
- Microfilmer – Machine used to produce microfilm
- Microprinting – Printing at a small scale
- NewspaperARCHIVE – Newspaper archive website
- Parts book – Catalog published by manufacturers (from the 70s, parts catalogs were often issued on microfiche)
- Preservation (library and archival science) – Set of activities aimed at prolonging the life of a record or object
- René Dagron – French photographer and inventor
- Stanhope (optical bijou) – Optical instrument

== Bibliography ==
Books

- Fussler, Herman (1942). Photographic Reproduction for Libraries. Studies in library science. Chicago: University of Chicago Press. OCLC 702713632.
- Rider, Fremont (1944). The Scholar and the Future of the Research Library: A Problem and Its Solution. Studies in library science. Hadham Press. OCLC 702713632.
- Luther, Federic (1965). Microfilm: A History, 1839-1900. National Microfilm Association.
- Teague, Sydney John (1977). Microform Librarianship. Butterworths. ISBN 0-408-70799-2. OCLC 2508095.
- Fair, Judy H., ed. (1979). Microforms Management in Special Libraries：A Reader. Microform Review series in library micrographics management. Vol. 5. Microform Review. ISBN 0-408-70799-2. OCLC 2508095.
- Meckler, Alan M. (1982). Micropublishing: A History of Scholarly Micropublishing in America, 1938-1980. Contributions in librarianship and information science. Vol. 40. Westport, CT: Greenwood Press. ISBN 0-313-23096-X. OCLC 7737740.
- Gunn, Michael J. (1985). Manual of Document Microphotography. Focal Press. ISBN 0-240-51146-8. OCLC 10123430.
- Saffady, William (2000). Micrographics: Technology for the 21st Century. Prairie Village, KS: ARMA International. ISBN 0-933997-93-0.
- Baker, Nicholson (2001). Double Fold: Libraries and the Assault on Paper. Vintage Books/Random House. ISBN 0-375-50444-3.

Articles

- Jamison, M. (1988). "The microcard: Fremont Rider's precomputer revolution". Libraries & Culture. 23: 1–17.
- Metcalf, K.D. (1945). "Implicatlons of Microfilm and Microprint for Libraries". Library Journal. 70 (15): 718–723.
- Molyneux, R.E. (1994). "What did rider do? An inquiry into the methodology of Fremont Rider's the scholar and the future of the research library". Libraries & Culture. 29: 297–325.

Periodicals

- Microform Review. Westport, CT: Microform Review, Inc.
  - Cumulative Microform Reviews, 1972-1976 (1979, 619 pp.)
- Journal of Micrographics. Silver Spring, MD: National Microform Association
  - later renamed to Journal of Information and Image Management
- Micrographics Equipment Review
- Microdoc (Journal of British Microfilm Association)
- NRCd Bulletin
- IMC Journal (IMC = International Micrographic Congress)

Catalogs

- Microform Research Collections: A Guide. Westport, Conn., Microform Review, 1977.
- Micropublishers' Trade List Annual. Westport, Conn., Microform Review, 1975—.
- Micrographics 1900-1977, A Bibliography, Michael R. Gabriel, Minnesota Scholarly Press, 1978.
- National Register of Microfilm Masters. Washington, DC: Library of Congress, 1965—.
- Newspapers in Microform, 1948-1983. 3 vols. Washington: Library of Congress, Catalog Publication Division, 1983.
- Newspapers in Microform, Washington: Library of Congress. 1978—. annual.
- Guide to Microforms in Print. Published by Microform Review Inc. U.S.A.
  - Updates: Microlist. Westport, Conn., Microform Review, 1977—.
- Subject Guide to Microforms in Print. Published by Microcard Editions, National Cash Register Company. 1962/1963—.
- Newspapers on Microfilms and Special Collections. Pushlished by Micro Photo Division. Bell & Howell Company.
- Serials in Microfilm. Published by University Microfilms, Xerox Company. 1972—.
- Books on Demand: A Catalog of OP Titles. Published by University Microfilms, Xerox Company.

Equipment Guides

- Ballou, Hubbard (1975). Guide to Micrographic Equipment (5th ed.). Silver Spring, MD: National Micrographics Association.

Miscellaneous

- Veaner, Allen B.; Meckler, Alan M. (1974). Microform Market Place, An International Directory of Micropublishing. Westport, CT: Microform Review.
- International Micrographics Source Book, annual.
