= Kodak Komstar =

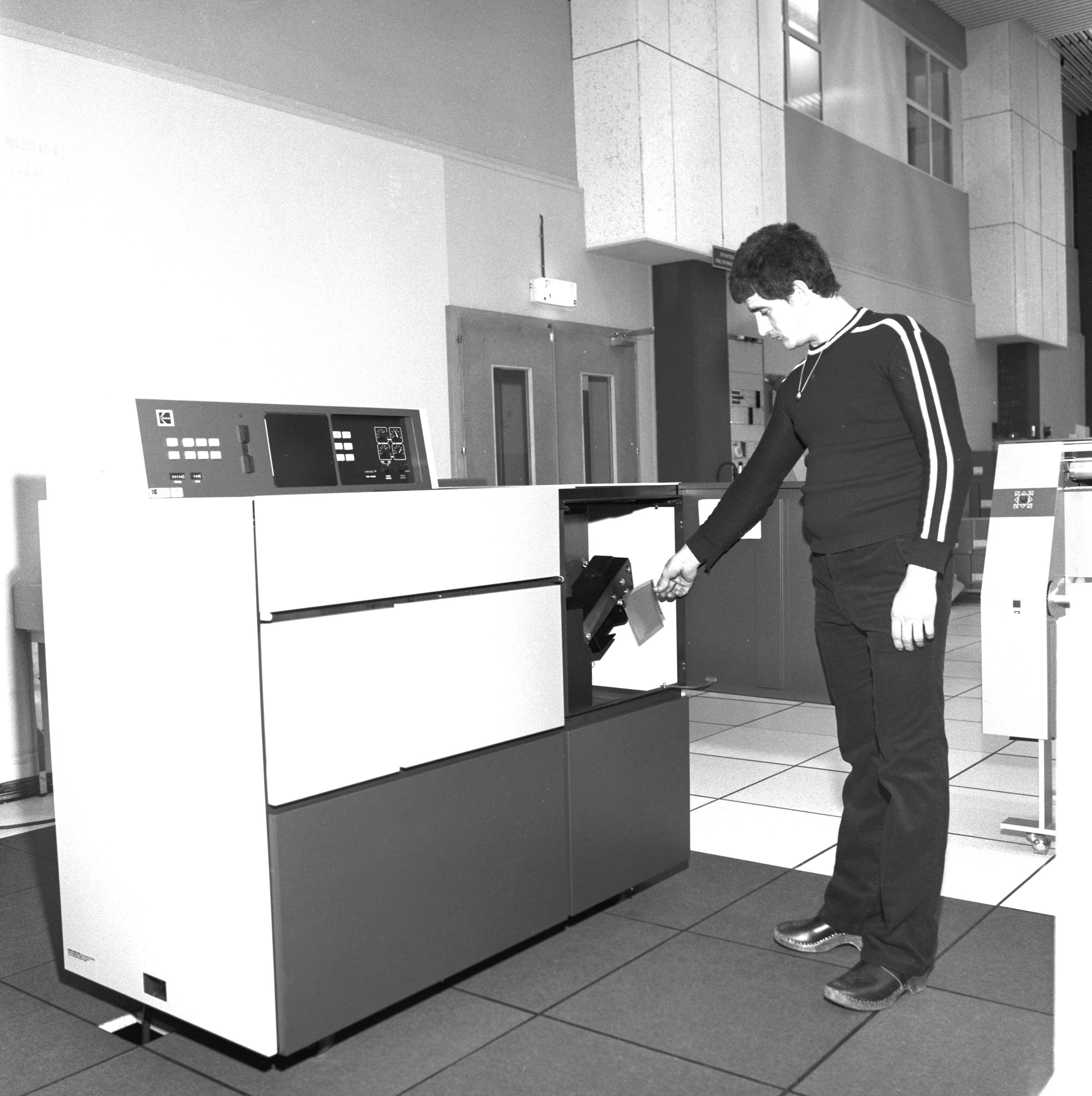
A Komstar unit in action at CERN in Geneva in 1981

The Kodak Komstar is a laser beam-based, dry-processing micrographics system made by the Eastman Kodak Company that enables computer output microfilm and microfiche (COM) from either a magnetic tape reel or via direct connection to an IBM System/370 mainframe. Introduced in 1977, the product line consisted of three models, the Komstar 100, 200, and 300. It remained in use at customer sites into the 1990s.

== Background ==
Kodak's previous COM offering was the KOM 90, an off-line wet-solution system. It was most suitable for COM uses involving large reports that were not intended for immediate reading or that were intended to go straight to archival storage. Moreover, KOM 90 found resistance from customers who did not want to bring it into raised-floor computer rooms for fear the processing chemicals would leak out and damage wiring and cabling underneath the floor.

== Product line ==
The Komstar was introduced in 1977. Unlike its predecessor, the Komstar employed a laser beam and a dry processing approach using Kodak's new Recordak Dacomatic DL SO-030 film. It worked by moving the laser beam to compose characters in a 7-by-9 point matrix, then write the columns of the matrix onto the film while proceeding line by line through a page. It could produce either 105mm microfiche or 16mm microfilm.

The Komstar was intended to require minimal supervision on the part of computer operators. Compared to wet-solution systems, it represented a considerable labor simplification and also allowed units to be placed in computer rooms without worry, with one customer reporting that it occupied only a third of the space as before.

The Komstar product line was available in three models:

- Komstar 100 – operates on-line in an IBM System/370 environment, controlled by Kodak Starlink I or II software running on the IBM mainframe;
- Komstar 200 – operates on-line in an IBM System/370 environment, controlled by Kodak Starlink III software running on the Komstar's internal processor;
- Komstar 300 – operates off-line, using a magnetic tape reel as input.

All three models were priced at over $100,000. The software was included with the hardware purchase.

== Use with IBM mainframes ==
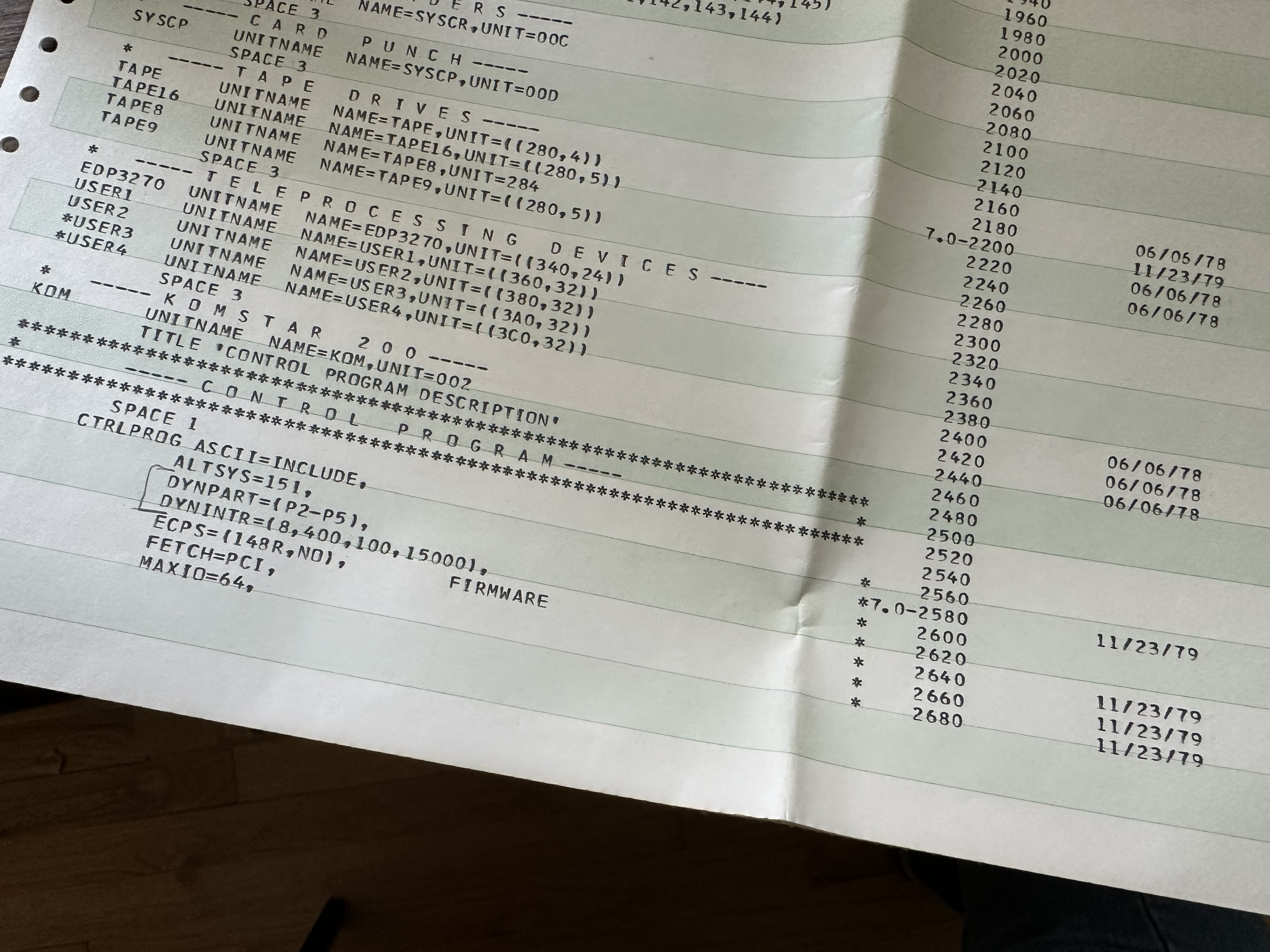
The Mount Sinai Medical Center in New York was a heavy user of COM for microfiche and an early adopter of the Komstar; here its definition of the Komstar 200 in System/370 OS/VS1 SYSGEN source

The Komstar could be connected to an IBM System/370 via byte-multiplexer, block-multiplexor, or selector. The Starlink software was built to mimic the interface characteristics of an IBM line printer, and came with its own User's Guide. Training to customers who needed to program to, or operate, the Komstar and the Starlink software was conducted in Kodak training centers in various cities.

As with a printer, the Komstar made use of IBM's forms control buffer (FCB) mechanism; IBM mainframe shops might store the source for the forms control information used to build FCB images for both their printer and the Komstar into their own partitioned data set such as ACME.SOURCE.FCBIMAGE, while load modules would go into SYS1.IMAGELIB. The Komstar system also had the ability to be directed with respect to forms overlay, line spacing, and character spacing, and for the Komstar 200, the ability to format print files on its processor instead of on the mainframe. Shops might create their own programmer catalogued procedures such as FCBIMAGE to encapsulate some of these choices and operations.

The Komstar was immediately compatible with follow-on systems in the IBM mainframe environment, such as the IBM 4300 series. It was also possible to spool print files to the Komstar from other IBM computer systems, such as the midrange IBM System/34 and distributed IBM 8100 systems.

== Ongoing product ==
The Komstar was manufactured by the Kodak Apparatus Division in Rochester, New York. The division was not located at the well-known Kodak Park complex, but rather at the separate-but-also-large Elmgrove site. Some progressive management techniques were used there, including workers taking greater responsibility for planning decisions; they signed the individual Komstar machines they made and entered into discussions with the customers using those particular machines.

In May 1985, the Komstar Microimage Processor IV was announced. which was billed as a fourth-generation solution. It could write barcodes on microfiche masters and use those to generate duplicate and collated microfiche. That processing was done inline within the mainframe environment, and the Komstar equipment could generate them at the rate of 1,800 per hour.

COM equipment was often used together with computer aided retrieval (CAR) systems, and Kodak's offerings in that domain were known as "KAR". In 1985, the KAR-8800 was announced. An earlier CAR capability was part of the Kodak Oracle product.

Despite the microform industry having become low growth by the early 1990s, the Komstar product line was a profitable one for Kodak. It was still being manufactured into those early 1990s, as part of Kodak's Office Imaging Group, and Kodak's other COM-based solutions were still being made and marketed then as well.

== End ==
However, those early 1990s saw computer output to laser disc becoming a replacement technology. Sales of COM units went into a steep decline. Nonetheless, Kodak Komstar systems were still in operation at some sites into the late 1990s.
