= Microphotograph =

Photographic process for producing very small pictures

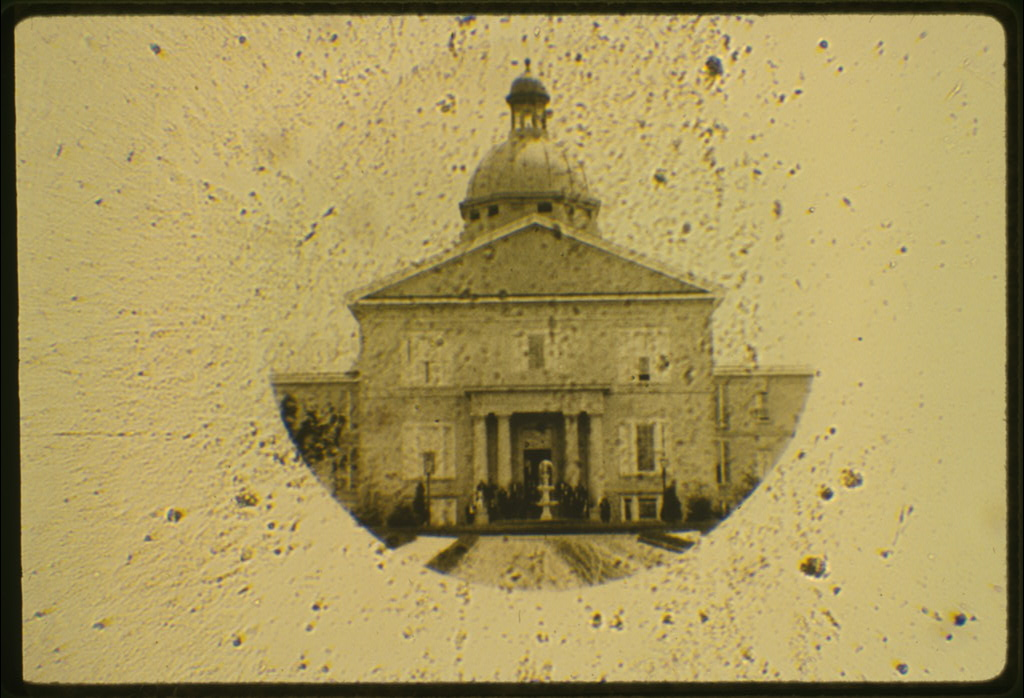
A 1 mm diameter microphotograph, c. 1858

Microphotographs are photographs shrunk to microscopic scale. Microphotography is the art of making such images. Applications of microphotography include espionage such as in the Hollow Nickel Case, where they are known as microfilm.

Using the daguerreotype process, John Benjamin Dancer was one of the first to produce microphotographs, in 1839. He achieved a reduction ratio of 160:1. Dancer perfected his reduction procedures with Frederick Scott Archer's wet collodion process, developed in 1850–51, but he dismissed his decades-long work on microphotographs as a personal hobby, and did not document his procedures. The idea that microphotography could be no more than a novelty was an opinion shared by the 1858 Dictionary of Photography, which called the process "somewhat trifling and childish."

Novelty viewing devices such as Stanhopes were once a popular way to carry and view microphotographs.

== Bibliography ==
- Stevens G. (1957). Microphotography: Photography at Extreme Resolution. London: Chapman & Hall.

== See also ==
- Macro photography
- Microprinting
