= Microfilmer =

Machine used to produce microfilm

A microfilmer is a machine used by the document management industry to create microfilm.

Microfilmers are also often called "imagers" in the industry. A microfilmer is a camera that is used to photograph documents to create a more compact and permanent record of the original in the form of roll-film or microfiche. Once the information contained on a paper document has been recorded onto microfilm, the information can be viewed later on a microfilm reader or viewer, or reproduced in paper form on a microfilm reader-printer.

Banking and insurance companies often convert their paper records using microfilmers. Libraries often keep newspapers and magazines which have been converted to roll-film or microfiche form using microfilmers. Microfilmers are often used to preserve government records. Many companies have switched from microfilm to digital imaging systems, which offer more convenient computer retrieval of records.

Microfilmers come in three basic configurations: planetary, rotary, or computer output microfilmers. A planetary microfilmer takes a snapshot of a stationary document held on a flat surface. While the picture is being taken, the film and the document do not move. In a rotary microfilmer, both the document and the film are moving in sync with one another while the picture is being taken. This allows for quicker filming of the document. Planetary microfilmers typically offer higher image resolution than rotary filmers, and can more readily film larger documents, as well as odd-shaped documents, such as books.

In the 1951 film When Worlds Collide, a roomful of planetary filmers and their operators are shown as they race against time to preserve crucial books for survivors of a doomed Earth.
