= Fremont Rider =

American writer, genealogist, and librarian

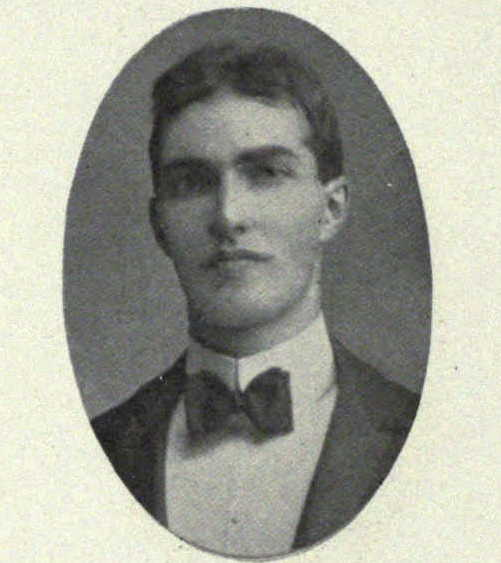
- Born: May 25, 1885; Trenton
- Died: October 26, 1962 (aged 77); Middletown
- Alma mater: Syracuse University; Wesleyan University
- Occupation: Librarian, writer, genealogist

Arthur Fremont Rider (May 25, 1885 – October 26, 1962) was an American writer, poet, editor, inventor, genealogist, and librarian. He studied under Melvil Dewey, of whom he wrote a biography for the American Library Association. Throughout his life he wrote in several genres including plays, poetry, short stories, non-fiction and an auto-biography which he wrote in the third-person. In the early 20th century he became a noted editor and publisher, working on such publications as Publishers Weekly and the Library Journal. In 1933 he became a librarian at Wesleyan University, eventually becoming director of the university's Olin Memorial Library and afterwards founding the Godfrey Memorial Library of genealogy and history in 1947. For his contributions to library science and as a librarian at Wesleyan University he was named one of the 100 Most Important Leaders of Library Science and the Library Profession in the twentieth century by the official publication of the American Library Association.

== Early life and education ==
Arthur Fremont Rider was born in Trenton, New Jersey on May 25, 1885. His parents were George Arthur Rider and Charlotte Elizabeth Meader Rider. The family was originally from Middletown, Connecticut, and Rider reports in his biography that his birth in New Jersey was an “accident” resulting from his father's frequent business trips to that state, on this occasion having brought his wife. Later in life Rider dropped his first name “for somewhat the same reasons that Joseph Rudyard Kipling did,” becoming known simply as Fremont Rider. It was in Middletown that the young Fremont Rider first developed a strong and lasting connection to libraries and library science. Rider himself claims in his autobiography that, although he attended school and received good marks, as a child he was largely self-educated at the Russell Public Library in Middletown. At thirteen, Rider was given access to the library at Wesleyan University by the librarian, William James, when the young boy felt he had “outgrown” the local public library. After receiving permission to use the University library “I went out of Professor James’ office walking on air,” Rider quotes himself; “I had now under my finger tips, not merely the treasures of the Indies, but the very much greater treasures of the Wesleyan University Library.”

In 1905 Rider received his degree, Bachelor of Philosophy, from Syracuse University. He received a Masters with Phi Beta Kappa from Wesleyan in 1934, a year after the latter university's taking him on as a librarian in 1933. In 1937, Syracuse honored Rider with a Litterarum humanarum doctor degree.

Rider attended New York State Library School in 1907, but left before graduating to help his mentor, Melvil Dewey, on a revision of the latter's Decimal Classification system. As Rider notes, “when one has been a hero worshipper since the age of eleven, and one’s hero invites one to join forces with him, one does not hesitate!” Indeed, Fremont Rider always looked up to and had great admiration for his “hero” and teacher. In the preface to his panegyric biography of Dewey, Rider refers to him as a genius and:

“Whether we like to admit it or not, geniuses cannot in fairness be judged by the standards we apply to ordinary folk. … Except for him I would never have entered the library profession. Except for him there would have been no library profession (in the form that we know it) for me to enter. ”

Joining Dewey at his Lake Placid Club, Rider met both his first and second wives. On October 8, 1908 Rider married Grace Godfrey, who was Dewey's niece. That marriage produced two children; a son, Leland, born in 1910; and a daughter, Deirdre, born 1913. Grace Godfrey died in 1950 and one year later Rider married Marie Gallup Ambrose who was the daughter of Asa Oran Gallup, the Club's manager at the time Rider was there with Melvil Dewey. Marie Gallup Ambrose was also the grandniece of Melvil Dewey.

== Career ==
In 1907 Rider moved to New York City and after some trial was given a job as associate editor of The Delineator. In 1910 Rider returned to the field of librarianship, if indirectly, by joining the R. R. Bowker's publishing company, and taking the position of Managing Editor for Publishers Weekly, and Library Journal in 1914. Both positions he held until 1917. From 1909 to 1921 Fremont Rider worked as an editor or publisher for ten different periodicals including: American Library Annual, Information, the New Idea Women’s Magazine, the Monthly Book Review, International Military Digest, and The Business Digest. Both Information, which Rider bought from Bowker, and the International Military Digest, Rider published through his own Rider Press, which he ran as president from 1914-1932. In 1918 Rider also became vice president of the Arrow Publishing Company.

Fremont Rider wrote on numerous topics throughout his life, and voiced his opinion and suggested solutions for the problems he saw in many of them. While working at The Delineator he wrote his first book, Are the Dead Alive in which he attempted to present the case for psychical research, and in general was what Rider believed to be an objective approach to the popular subject of “Spiritualism.” At the height of the Great Depression Rider published an article in The North American Review in which he identified the class warfare promoted by industrial unions as the principal cause of the labor troubles, although he admitted that the solution to the problem of “poverty amidst plenty” was not to cut back on production, but to increase wages, and so “increase purchasing power” of those who would buy the products of industrial and agricultural industry. After World War II Rider wrote a short book in which he advocated for a true One-World government. His proposed solution for the question of legislative power allotted to the various nation participants was one based on an “intellectual” index, that would translate, in his words, to “very real, but vaguely defined, concept that we call ‘national importance’.”

== Legacy ==
In 1933 Rider returned to Middletown to take a permanent librarianship position at Wesleyan. A year later the university awarded him a Masters ad eundum, Phi Beta Kappa. Subsequently, after becoming director of Wesleyan’s Olin Memorial Library, Rider wrote his most significant work on the subject of Library Science, The Scholar and The Future of the Research Library (published in 1944). In The Scholar, he laid out the problem of increasing shortage of space in research libraries and described the microcard, a microform of his own invention being a 7 and a half by 12 and a half centimeter opaque card. Upon the catalogue, or front-side, would be the catalogue information. Upon the reverse, Rider wanted to reproduce “as many as 250 pages of an ordinary 12mo book on the back of a single card.” The idea was inspired by recent developments he had been following in the production and printing of micro-text, especially by the Readex Microprint Corporation. Rider envisioned that these microcards would serve both as the catalogue and collection, thus not only saving shelving space by eliminating books, but also doing away with the need to have a catalogue collection separate from manuscript collection. Researchers would search the catalogue for the entry they wished, and then having selected it would take the card to a reader machine which might be no bigger than a briefcase.

When the book was published the problem of research library expansion was a significant concern for those in the profession. Although he has since been proven wrong in his assertion that research libraries double in size every sixteen years, Rider's prediction that microform material would be employed to solve the issue of collection space and growth was prescient though at the time he could not have known that microform would in turn be superseded by the digital revolution. His idea that a library's catalogue and collection could be one and the same foreshadowed the possibilities opened by digital media collections. Rider was also noted for his controversial method of book shelving which involved shaving the books to make them fit in tighter spaces.

In addition, while director of Olin, Rider "started putting together the idea for a monumental index that would help genealogists all over the world in their research. That was the beginning of the American Genealogical Biographical Index (AGBI) and the Godfrey Memorial Library."
