= John Benjamin Dancer =

British scientific instrument maker and inventor of microphotography

- Born: October 8, 1812
- Died: November 1887 (aged 75)
- Burial place: Sale, Greater Manchester, England
- Occupation: Inventor of the stereoscopic camera Microphotography
- Children: 2, Elizabeth Eleanor, Anna Maria

John Benjamin Dancer (8 October 1812 – 24 November 1887) was a British scientific instrument maker and inventor of microphotography. He also pioneered stereography.

== Career ==
By 1835, he controlled his father's instrument making business in Liverpool. He was responsible for various inventions, but did not patent many of his ideas. In 1856, he invented the stereoscopic camera (GB patent 2064/1856).

Dancer improved the Daniell cell by introducing the porous pot cell, which he invented in 1838. He was a leading inventor and practitioner in the emerging field of microphotography, work he began shortly after the Daguerreotype process was first announced in 1839. His novel uses of microphotography, such as "the reduction of the 680-word tablet erected in memory of the electrician William Sturgeon to a positive one-sixteenth of an inch in diameter", attracted much public attention. He assisted the physicist James Prescott Joule with the development of scientific instruments such as an apparatus for measuring the internal capacity of the bore of thermometer tubes, a tangent galvanometer, and other devices useful in Joule's research. A substantial collection of Dancer's papers, photographs, and apparatus is held by the Ransom Center at the University of Texas.

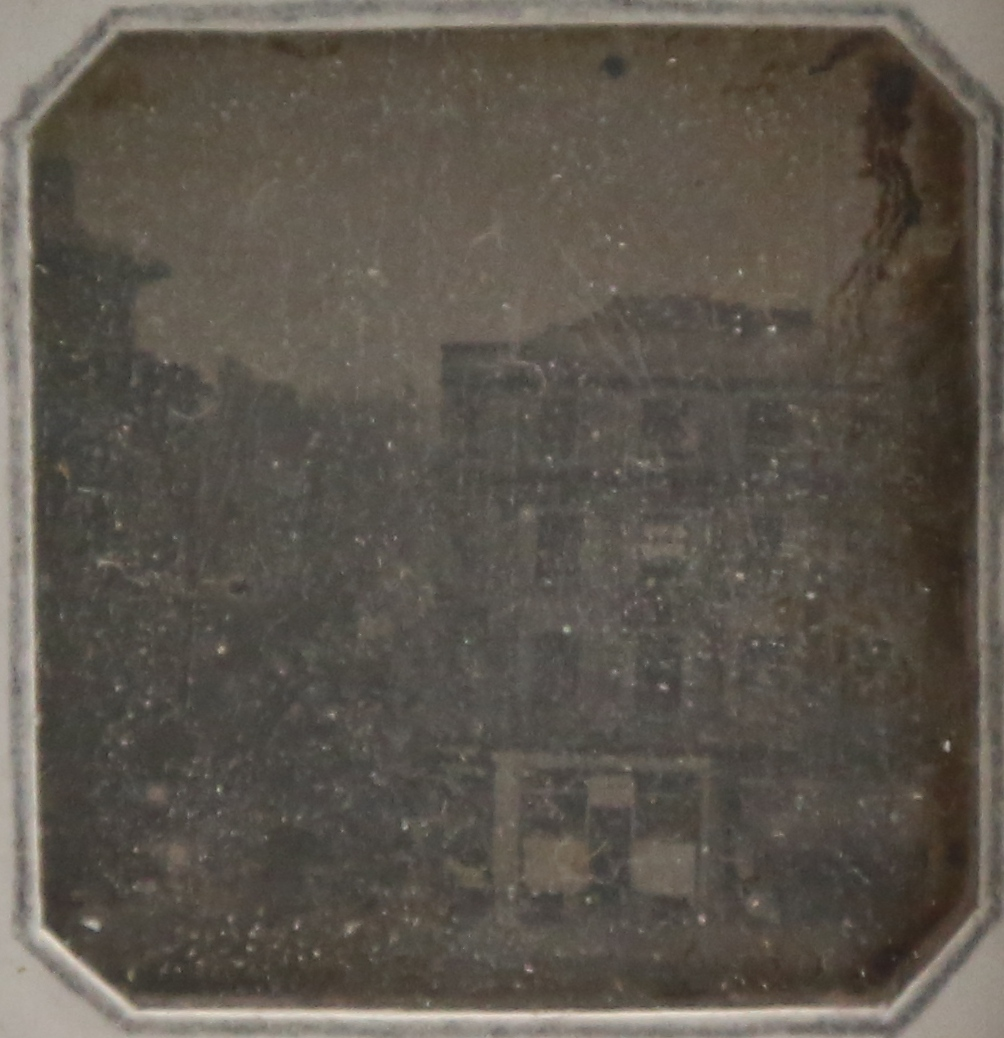
John Benjamin Dancer's 1842 daguerreotype of Manchester from the roof of the Royal Exchange

In 1842 Dancer took a daguerreotype from the top of the Royal Exchange which is the earliest known photograph showing part of Manchester.

== Personal life ==
He was elected to membership of the Manchester Literary and Philosophical Society on 19 April 1842 Manchester., and is recorded on a plaque in Bow Lane Manchester. He died in November 1887 at the age of 75 and was buried at Brooklands Cemetery, plot D.2244, Sale, Greater Manchester. He had two daughters, Elizabeth Eleanor and Anna Maria.

== External articles and references ==
- John Benjamin Dancer, Museum of Science & Industry, Manchester
- John Benjamin Dancer Manchester Microscopical & Natural History Society.
