= Enterprise report management =

Enterprise report management (ERM or ERP) systems support very high-volume generation, handling and storage of reports and documents. Many ERM systems are used for online customer self-service document generation and delivery.

== History ==
ERM started out as a technology called computer output to laser disc (COLD) based on LaserDiscs. In 2002, Mason Grigsby, known for his seminal work with INSCI in the late 1980s, promoted a name change for the technology and pointed out that "ERM" more accurately describes the process. The use of laserdiscs was replaced by the use of other optical storage technologies and is only one of several appropriate media for computer report storage.

== See also ==
- ETL
- SQL Server Reporting Services
