= 50 new shekel banknote =

Israeli banknote

Fifty New shekels Fifty New sheqalim
- Country: Israel
- Value: ₪50
- Width: 136 mm
- Height: 71 mm
- Years of printing: Series C: 2014-present Series B: 1999-2014; Series A: 1985-1999

Obverse
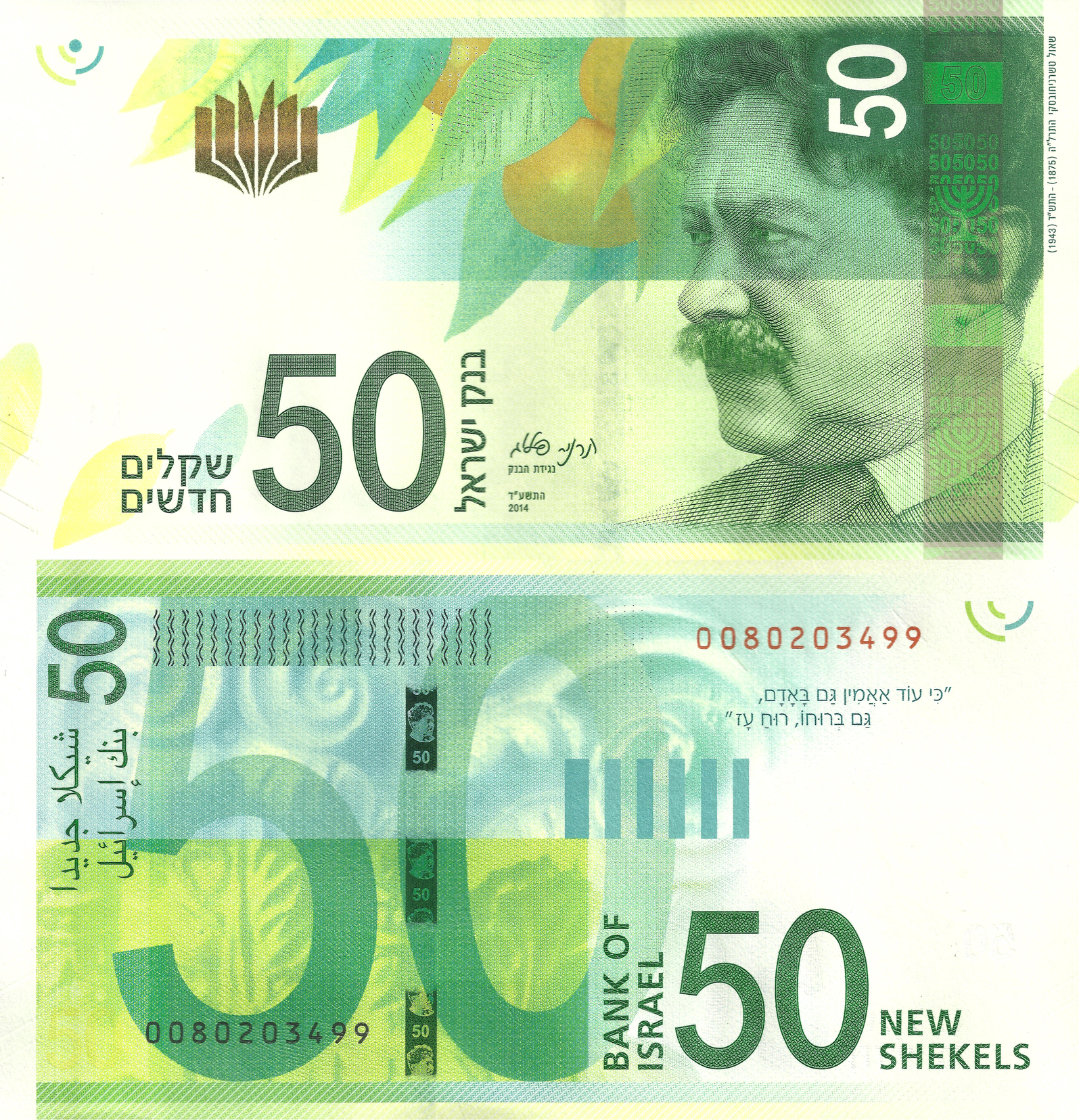
- Design: Shaul Tchernichovsky, a citrus tree and its fruits.
- Design date: Series C: 16 September 2014

Reverse
- Design: The background design is a Corinthian column, and lines from the poem "I Believe" of Shaul Tchernichovsky.
- Designer: Ms. Osnat Eshel

The fifty shekel note (₪50) is a banknote of the Israeli new shekel, It was first issued in Series A 1985 with the Series B in 1999 and Series C in 2014 the latest.

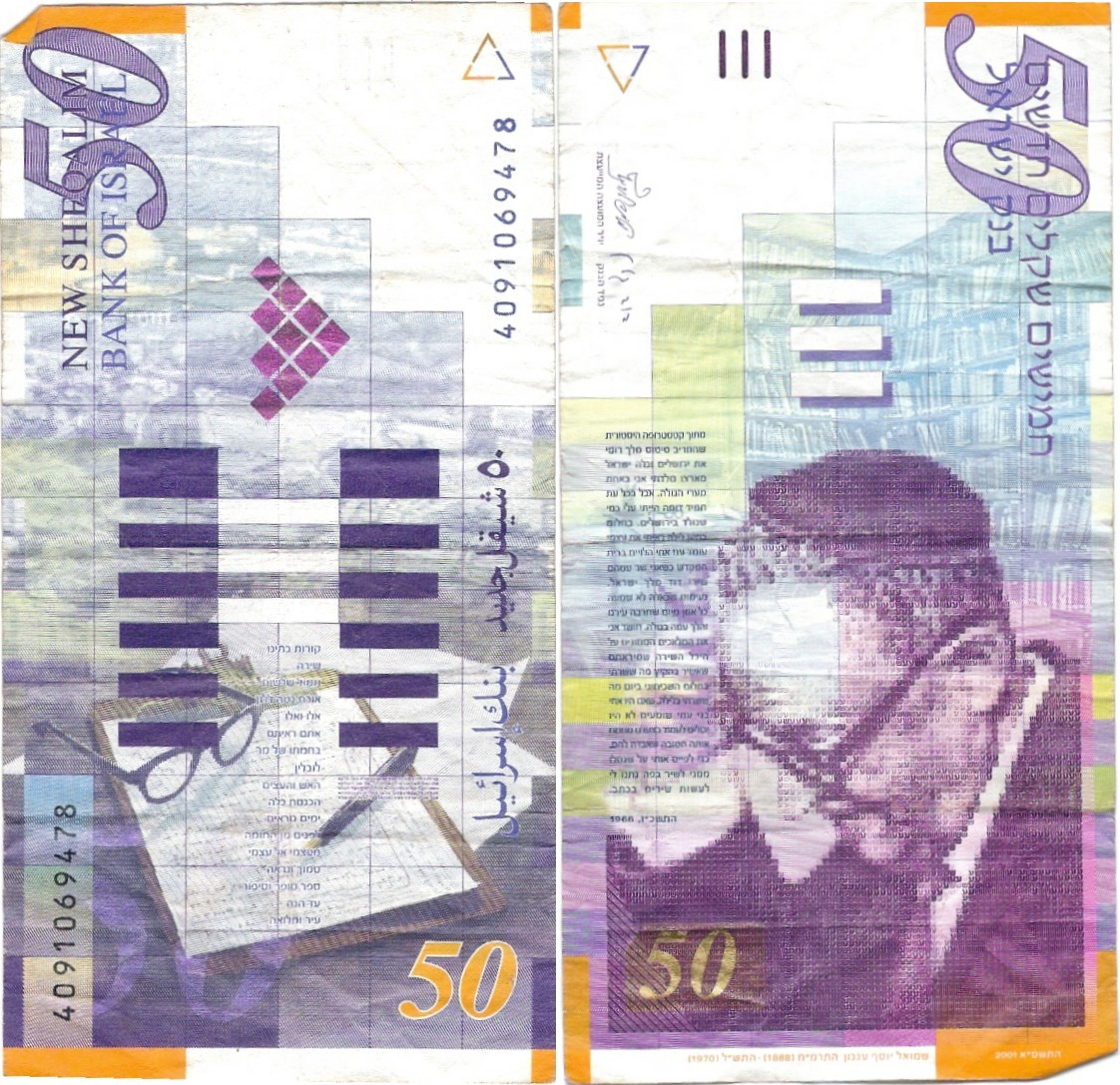
₪50 issued in 1999 (New Shekel Series B banknote)

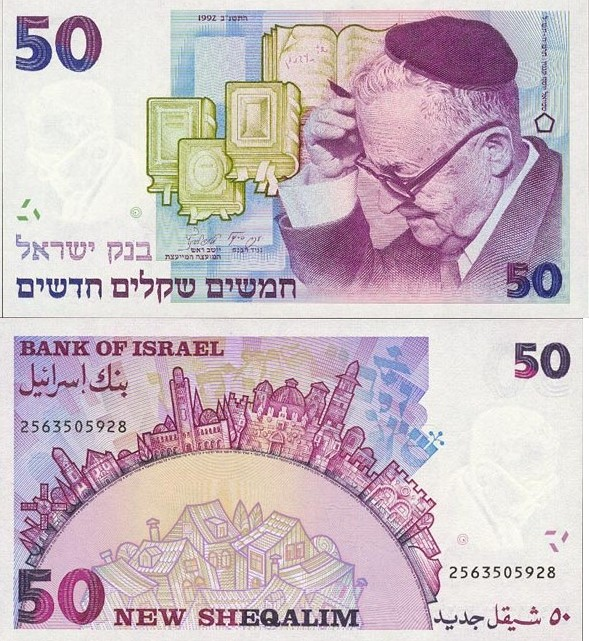
₪50 issued in 1985 (New Shekel Series A banknote)

== Design ==
=== Security features (New Shekel Series C) ===
LOOK at the banknote

- The transparent portrait: A watermark image of the portrait, identical to the portrait shown on the banknote observe, with the denomination next to it. Hold the banknote up to the light and make sure that the portrait and the denomination are visible. This feature can be viewed from either side of the banknote.
- The perforated numerals: Tiny holes forming the shape of the banknote's denomination(50)are perforated at the top part of the banknote. Hold the banknote up to the light and make sure you notice them. This feature can be viewed from either side of the banknote.
- The window thread: A green security thread is embedded in the banknote and is revealed in three "windows" on the back of the banknote. Hold the banknote up to the light and make sure that the portrait and the nominal value are clearly visible in the windows. The thread will change its shade when tilting the banknote.

FEEL the banknote

- The raised ink: The portrait the Governor's signature, the Hebrew and Gregorian year, text in three languages, and the designated features for the blind on the banknote's margins are printed in intaglio. Touch these details with your finger, on both sides of the banknote, and you can feel the raised ink.

TILT the banknote

- The glittering stripe: A transparent and glittering stripe is incorporated into the banknote vertically, next to the portrait. Tilt the banknote in various directions and make sure that the Menorah symbol and the denomination appear and disappear intermittently along the stripe.
- The golden book: An artistic reflective foil element in the shape of an "open golden book". Tilt the banknote backward and forward and make sure that the "book" changes its color from gold to green. Simultaneously you can see the horizontal bar moving up and down the "book".

'FEATURES FOR THE BLIND AND VISION IMPAIRED

- Lines in the margins: Pairs of lines are printed in raised ink on each banknote, and their number increases as the denomination of the banknote grows. The pairs of lines are located in the lower margins on the left and the right, and they can be felt with the fingers.
- Different length for each banknote : The banknote in the new series have a different lengths. There is a 7mm difference between denomination.
- Denominational numerals : Large and dark digits are printed in intaglio on a light background, and light digits are printed on a dark background.
- Banknote color : Each banknote has a dominant color.

=== Security features (New Shekel Series B) ===
- Latent image: A triangle in the right-hand corner.
- Watermark: Portrait of Shmuel Yosef Agnon and a small circle beneath it enclosing the initial of his surname (in Hebrew).
- Security thread: Threaded through the paper below the middle of the note.
- Microtext: To the right of the main text with titles of seventeen of Shmuel Yosef Agnon's books.
- Optical Variable Ink: A triangle composed of small squares, with the apex pointing to the right.
- See-through: A small triangle printed on either side of the note; the two triangles form a precise Star of David.
- Serial numbers: Once in blue and once in black which reflects UV light.

=== Security Features (New Shekel Series A) ===
- Watermark: Portrait of Shmuel Yosef Agnon.
- Security thread: In the middle of the note.
- Look-through: A three-sided pattern on the front merges with another on the back to form a Star of David when held against the light.

== Circulation ==
The current ₪50 note in circulation are the Series C issued since 2014 with a green color scheme and the Series B issued since 1999, it measures 71 x 138 mm with a purple color scheme.

The ₪50 Series A bank notes were issued from 1985 to 1999 and measured 76 x 138 mm with a purple color scheme. The ₪50 Series A bank notes were withdrawn from circulation by 2005.
