= 200 new shekel banknote =

Highest denomination banknote of the Israeli new shekel

Two Hundred new shekels Two Hundred new sheqalim
- Country: Israel
- Value: ₪200
- Width: 150 mm
- Height: 71 mm
- Years of printing: Series C: 2015-present Series B: 1999-present Series A: 1992-1999

Obverse
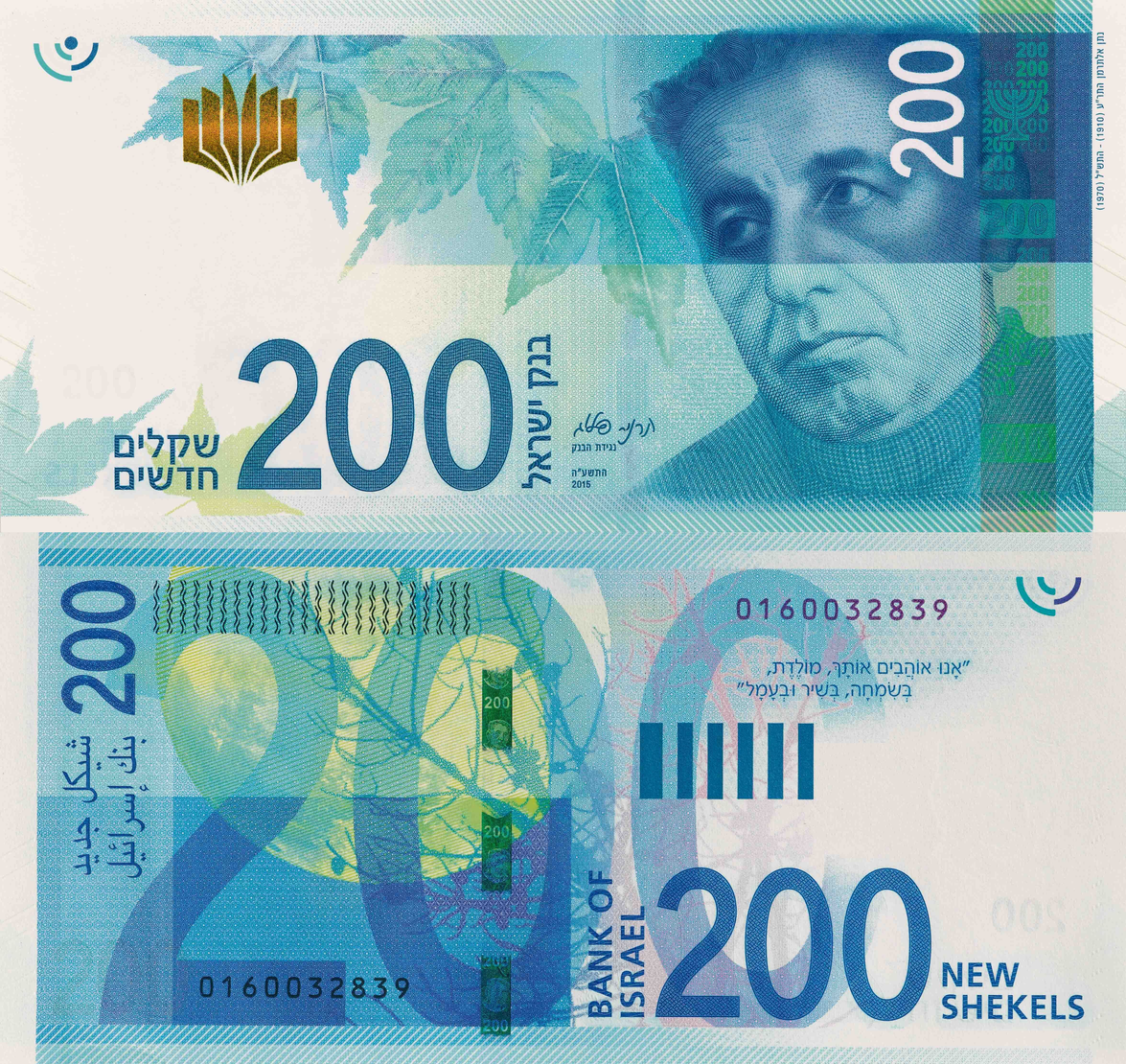
- Design: Nathan Alterman; the poem "Eternal Meeting" in microprinting; Fall leaves in the background.
- Design date: Series C: 23 December 2015

Reverse
- Design: Moonlit flora, and an excerpt from Natan Alterman’s poem, “Morning Song”.
- Designer: Ms. Osnat Eshel

The two hundred new shekel note (₪200) is the highest denomination banknote of the Israeli new shekel, It was first issued in Series A 1992 with the Series B in 1999 and Series C in 2015 the latest.

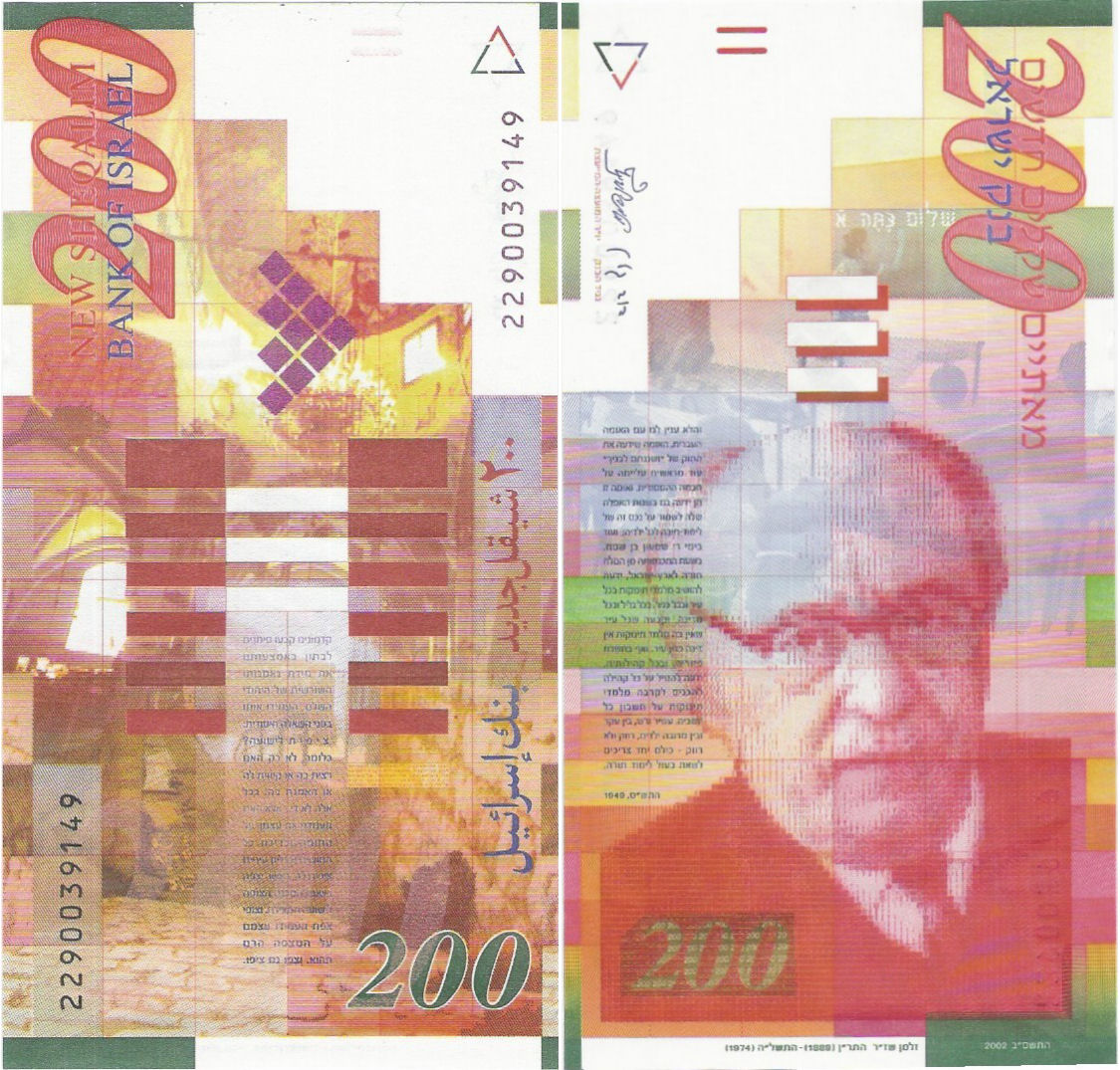
₪200 issued in 1999 (New Shekel Series B banknote)

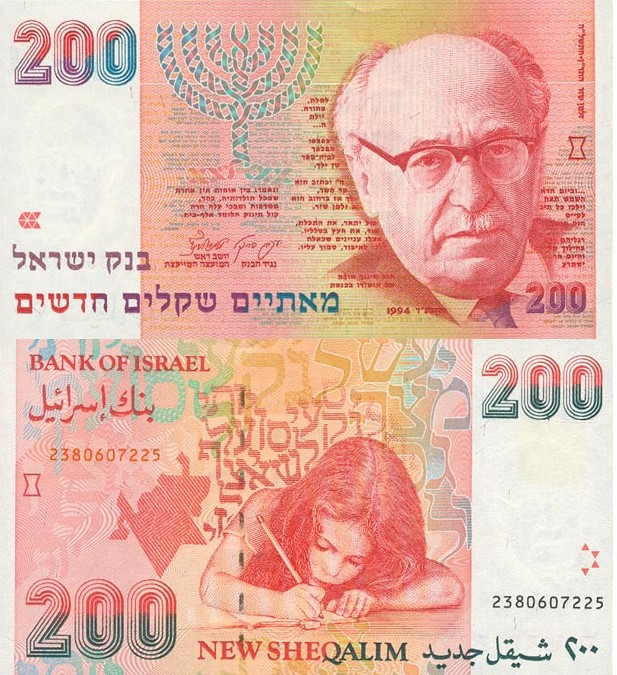
₪200 issued in 1992 (New Shekel Series A banknote)

== Design ==
=== Security features (New Shekel Series C) ===
LOOK at the banknote

- The transparent portrait: A watermark image of the portrait, identical to the portrait shown on the banknote observe, with the denomination next to it. Hold the banknote up to the light and make sure that the portrait and the denomination are visible. This feature can be viewed from either side of the banknote.
- The perforated numerals: Tiny holes forming the shape of the banknote's denomination (200) are perforated at the top part of the banknote. Hold the banknote up to the light and make sure you notice them. This feature can be viewed from either side of the banknote.
- The window thread: A blue-purple security thread is embedded in the banknote and is revealed in three "windows" on the back of the banknote. Hold the banknote up to the light and make sure that the portrait and the nominal value are clearly visible in the windows. The thread will change its shade from blue to purple when tilting the banknote.

FEEL the banknote

- The raised ink: The portrait the Governor's signature, the Hebrew and Gregorian year, text in three languages, and the designated features for the blind on the banknote's margins are printed in intaglio. Touch these details with your finger, on both sides of the banknote, and you can feel the raised ink.

TILT the banknote

- The glittering stripe: A transparent and glittering stripe is incorporated into the banknote vertically, next to the portrait. Tilt the banknote in various directions and make sure that the Menorah symbol and the denomination appear and disappear intermittently along the stripe.
- The golden book: An artistic reflective foil element in the shape of an "open golden book". Tilt the banknote backward and forward and make sure that the "book" changes its color from gold to green. Simultaneously you can see the horizontal bar moving up and down the "book".

'FEATURES FOR THE BLIND AND VISION IMPAIRED

- Lines in the margins: Pairs of lines are printed in raised ink on each banknote, and their number increases as the denomination of the banknote grows. The pairs of lines are located in the lower margins on the left and the right, and they can be felt with the fingers.
- Different length for each banknote : The banknote in the new series have a different lengths. There is a 7mm difference between denomination.
- Denominational numerals : Large and dark digits are printed in intaglio on a light background, and light digits are printed on a dark background.
- Banknote color : Each banknote has a dominant color.

=== Security features (New Shekel Series B) ===
- Latent image: A triangle in the right-hand corner.
- Watermark: Portrait of Zalman Shazar and a small circle beneath it enclosing the initial of his surname (in Hebrew).
- Security thread: Threaded through the paper below the middle of the note.
- Microtext: To the right of the main text with titles of fifteen of Zalman Shazar's works.
- Optical Variable Ink: A triangle, composed of small squares, with the apex pointing to the right.
- See-through: A small triangle printed on either side of the note; the two triangles form a precise Star of David.
- Serial numbers: Once in violet and once in black which reflects UV light.

=== Security Features (New Shekel Series A) ===
- Watermark: Portrait of Zalman Shazar.
- Security thread: In the middle of the note.
- Look-through: Eight triangles on the front merge with four triangles on the back to form a Star of David when held against the light.

== Circulation ==
The current ₪200 note in circulation are the Series C issued since 2015 with a blue color scheme and the Series B issued since 1999, it measures 71 x 138 mm with a red color scheme.

The ₪200 Series A bank notes were issued from 1992 to 1999 and measured 76 x 138 mm with a red color scheme. The ₪200 Series A bank notes were withdrawn from circulation by 2005.
