= 20 new shekel banknote =

Israeli currency denomination

Twenty New shekels Twenty New sheqalim
- Country: Israel
- Value: ₪20
- Width: 129 mm
- Height: 71 mm
- Years of printing: Series C: 2017-present Series B: 1999–2017; Series A: 1988–1999

Obverse
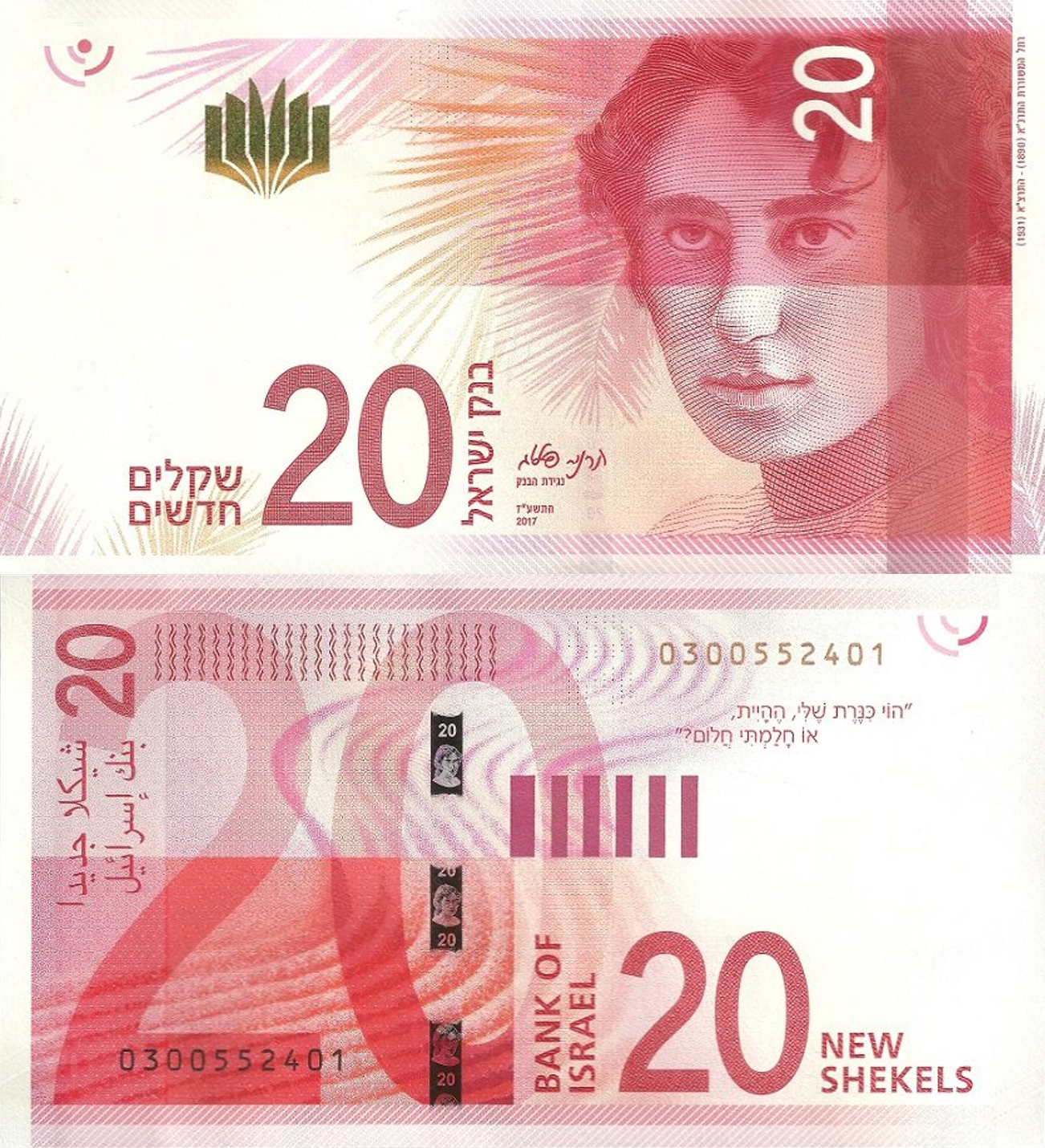
- Design: Portrait of Rachel Bluwstein; the poem Kinneret in microprinting; Palm tree branches in the background
- Design date: Series C: 23 November 2017

Reverse
- Design: Stylized Sea shore; Segment from the poem Perhaps it was nothing…
- Designer: Ms. Osnat Eshel

The twenty new shekel note (₪20) is the lowest value banknote of the Israeli new shekel, It was first issued in Series A 1988, with the Series B in 1999, and Series C in 2017. Currently, it features the Hebrew poet, Rachel Bluwstein.

== Design ==
=== Security features (New Shekel Series C) ===
LOOK at the banknote

- The transparent portrait: A watermark image of the portrait, identical to the portrait shown on the banknote observe, with the denomination next to it. Hold the banknote up to the light and make sure that the portrait and the denomination are visible. This feature can be viewed from either side of the banknote.
- The perforated numerals: Tiny holes forming the shape of the banknote's denomination (20) are perforated at the top part of the banknote. Hold the banknote up to the light and make sure you notice them. This feature can be viewed from either side of the banknote.
- The window thread: A blue-purple security thread is embedded in the banknote and is revealed in three "windows" on the back of the banknote. Hold the banknote up to the light and make sure that the portrait and the nominal value are clearly visible in the windows. The thread will change its shade from blue to purple when tilting the banknote.

FEEL the banknote

- The raised ink: The portrait the Governor's signature, the Hebrew and Gregorian year, text in three languages, and the designated features for the blind on the banknote's margins are printed in intaglio. Touch these details with your finger, on both sides of the banknote, and you can feel the raised ink.

TILT the banknote

- The glittering stripe: A transparent and glittering stripe is incorporated into the banknote vertically, next to the portrait. Tilt the banknote in various directions and make sure that the Menorah symbol and the denomination appear and disappear intermittently along the stripe.
- The golden book: An artistic reflective foil element in the shape of an "open golden book". Tilt the banknote backward and forward and make sure that the "book" changes its color from gold to green. Simultaneously you can see the horizontal bar moving up and down the "book".

'FEATURES FOR THE BLIND AND VISION IMPAIRED

- Lines in the margins: Pairs of lines are printed in raised ink on each banknote, and their number increases as the denomination of the banknote grows. The pairs of lines are located in the lower margins on the left and the right, and they can be felt with the fingers.
- Different length for each banknote : The banknote in the new series have a different lengths. There is a 7mm difference between denomination.
- Denominational numerals : Large and dark digits are printed in intaglio on a light background, and light digits are printed on a dark background.
- Banknote color : Each banknote has a dominant color.

=== Design in New Shekel Series B ===
==== Security features ====
- Latent image: A triangle in the right-hand corner.
- Watermark: Portrait of Moshe Sharett and a small circle beneath it enclosing the initial of his surname (in Hebrew).
- Security thread: Threaded through the paper below the middle of the note.
- Microtext: To the right of the main text with titles of seven books written by Moshe Sharett.
- Optical Variable Ink: A triangle composed of small squares, with the apex pointing to the right.
- See-through: A small triangle printed on either side of the note; the two triangles form a precise Star of David.
- Serial numbers: Once in olive-green and once in black which reflects UV light.

==== Polymer Edition ====
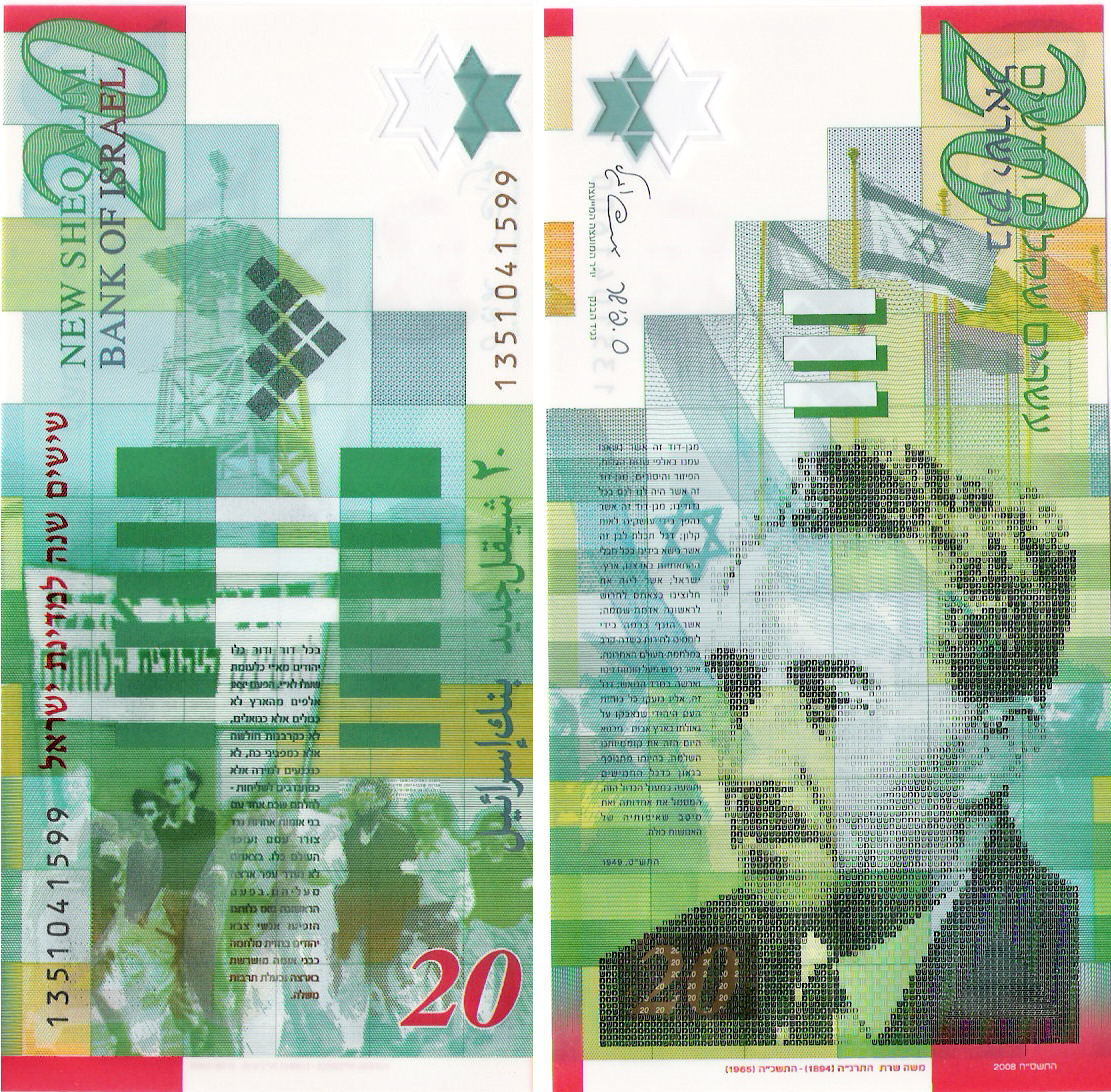
₪20 polymer version (2008 issue).

The additional red text on the polypropylene note (in reverse) reads "60 Years of the State of Israel" in Hebrew in red ink. It was only featured in a 1.8 million limited run close to the noted anniversary and is not present on a majority of notes.

Polymer banknotes are known to be more durable than traditional paper ones. The polymer note is printed by Orell Füssli Security Printing of Zürich, Switzerland.

=== Design in New Shekel Series A ===
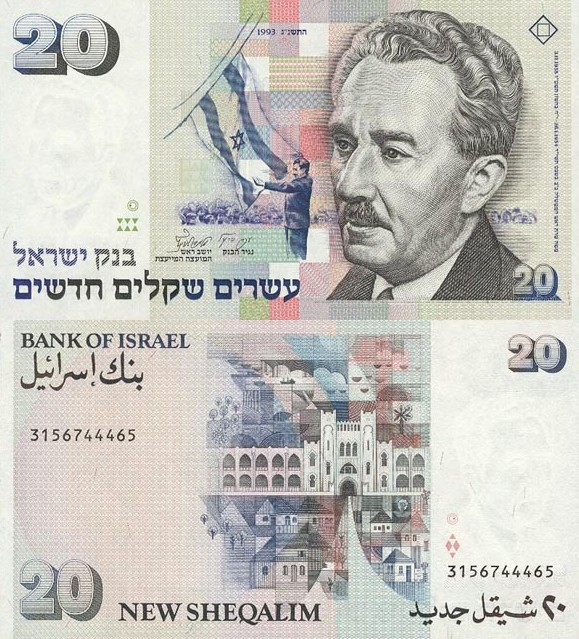
₪20 issued in 1988 (New Shekel Series A banknote) featuring Moshe Sharet and the Herzliya Hebrew Gymansium where Sharet studied.

==== Obverse ====
Portrait of Moshe Sharett; below, in a line legible under a magnifying glass, the titles of his seven books; the ceremony of the unfurling of the Israeli flag by Sharett at the U.N. building in 1949; the denomination "Twenty New Sheqalim" and "Bank of Israel" in Hebrew.

==== Reverse ====
Original building of the Herzlia high school where Sharett studied; a background of Little Tel Aviv; the denomination "20 New Sheqalim" and "Bank of Israel" in Arabic and English.

==== Security features ====
- Watermark: Portrait of Moshe Sharett.
- Security thread: In the middle of the note.
- Look-through: Six small triangles on the front merge with two rhombi and two triangles on the back to form a Star of David when held against the light.

== Circulation ==
The current ₪20 in circulation is the Series B issued from 1999, it measures 71 × 138 mm with a green color scheme. The ₪20 Series A bank notes were issued from 1988 to 1999 and measured 76 × 138 mm with a dark gray scheme. The ₪20 Series A bank notes were withdrawn from circulation by 2005.
