= 100 new shekel banknote =

Israeli currency denomination

One Hundred New shekels One Hundred New sheqalim
- Country: Israel
- Value: ₪100
- Width: 143 mm
- Height: 71 mm
- Years of printing: Series C: 2017-present Series B: 1999-2017; Series A: 1986-1999

Obverse
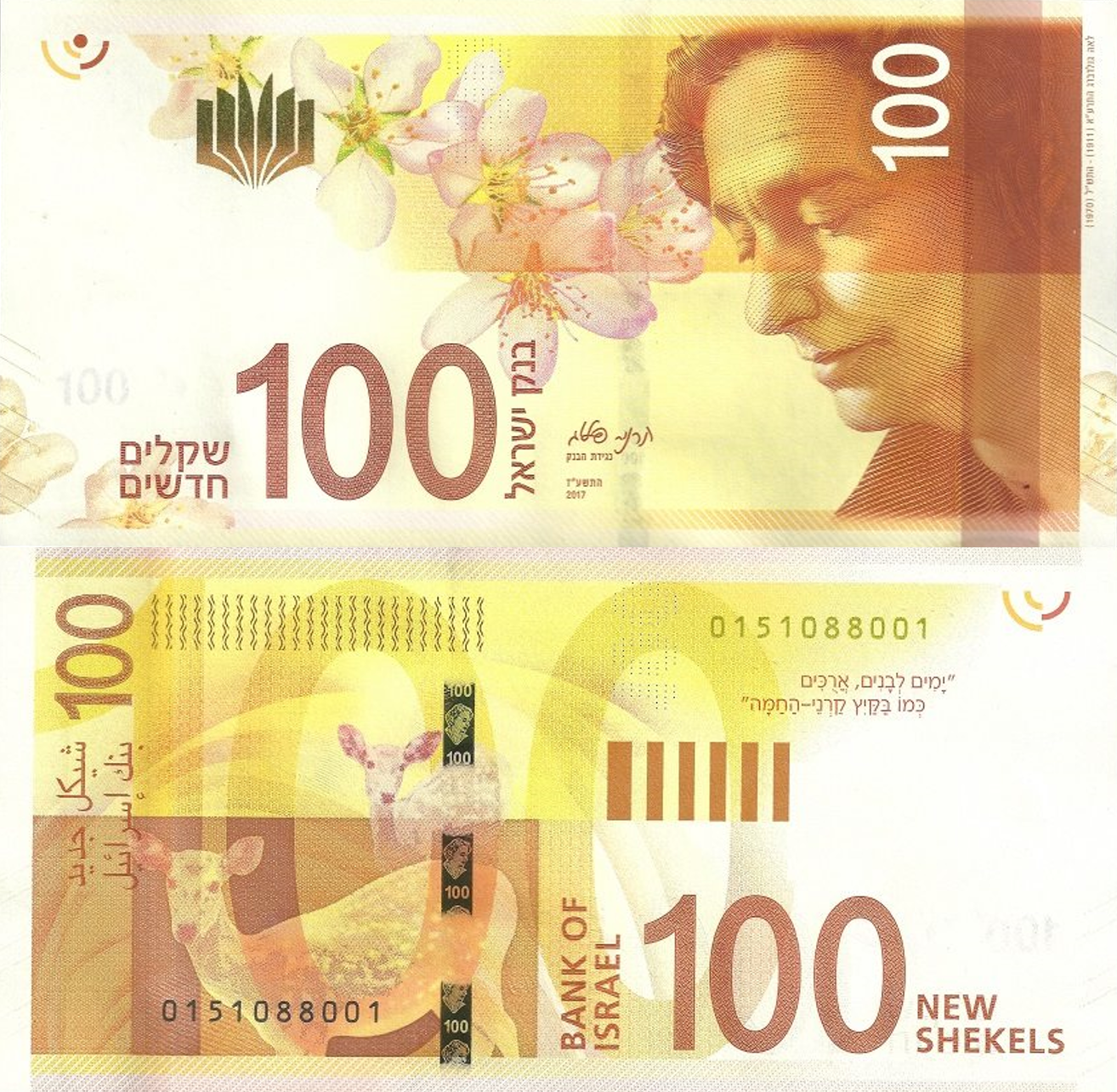
- Design: Portrait of Leah Goldberg; the poem In the land of my love the almond tree blossoms in microprinting; Almond tree blossoms in the background.
- Design date: Series C: 23 November 2017

Reverse
- Design: A group of gazelles; Segment from the poem: White days.
- Designer: Ms. Osnat Eshel

The one hundred new shekel note (₪100) is a banknote of the Israeli new shekel, It was first issued in Series A 1986, with the Series B in 1999 and Series C in 2017.

== Design ==
=== Security features (New Shekel Series C) ===
LOOK at the banknote

- The transparent portrait: A watermark image of the portrait, identical to the portrait shown on the banknote observe, with the denomination next to it. Hold the banknote up to the light and make sure that the portrait and the denomination are visible. This feature can be viewed from either side of the banknote.
- The perforated numerals: Tiny holes forming the shape of the banknote's denomination (100) are perforated at the top part of the banknote. Hold the banknote up to the light and make sure you notice them. This feature can be viewed from either side of the banknote.
- The window thread: A blue-purple security thread is embedded in the banknote and is revealed in three "windows" on the back of the banknote. Hold the banknote up to the light and make sure that the portrait and the nominal value are clearly visible in the windows. The thread will change its shade from blue to purple when tilting the banknote.

FEEL the banknote

- The raised ink: The portrait the Governor's signature, the Hebrew and Gregorian year, text in three languages, and the designated features for the blind on the banknote's margins are printed in intaglio. Touch these details with your finger, on both sides of the banknote, and you can feel the raised ink.

TILT the banknote

- The glittering stripe: A transparent and glittering stripe is incorporated into the banknote vertically, next to the portrait. Tilt the banknote in various directions and make sure that the Menorah symbol and the denomination appear and disappear intermittently along the stripe.
- The golden book: An artistic reflective foil element in the shape of an "open golden book". Tilt the banknote backward and forward and make sure that the "book" changes its color from gold to green. Simultaneously you can see the horizontal bar moving up and down the "book".

'FEATURES FOR THE BLIND AND VISION IMPAIRED

- Lines in the margins: Pairs of lines are printed in raised ink on each banknote, and their number increases as the denomination of the banknote grows. The pairs of lines are located in the lower margins on the left and the right, and they can be felt with the fingers.
- Different length for each banknote : The banknote in the new series have a different lengths. There is a 7mm difference between denomination.
- Denominational numerals : Large and dark digits are printed in intaglio on a light background, and light digits are printed on a dark background.
- Banknote color : Each banknote has a dominant color.

=== Design in New Shekel Series B ===
==== Security features ====
- Latent image: A triangle in the right-hand corner.
- Watermark: Portrait of Itzhak Ben-Zvi and a small circle beneath it enclosing the initial of his surname (in Hebrew).
- Security thread: Threaded through the paper below the middle of the note.
- Microtext: To the right of the main text with titles of nine books written by Itzhak Ben-Zvi.
- Optical Variable Ink: A triangle composed of small squares, with the apex pointing to the right.
- See-through: A small triangle printed on either side of the note; the two triangles form a precise Star of David.
- Serial numbers: Once in orange and once in black which reflects UV light.

=== Design in New Shekel Series A ===
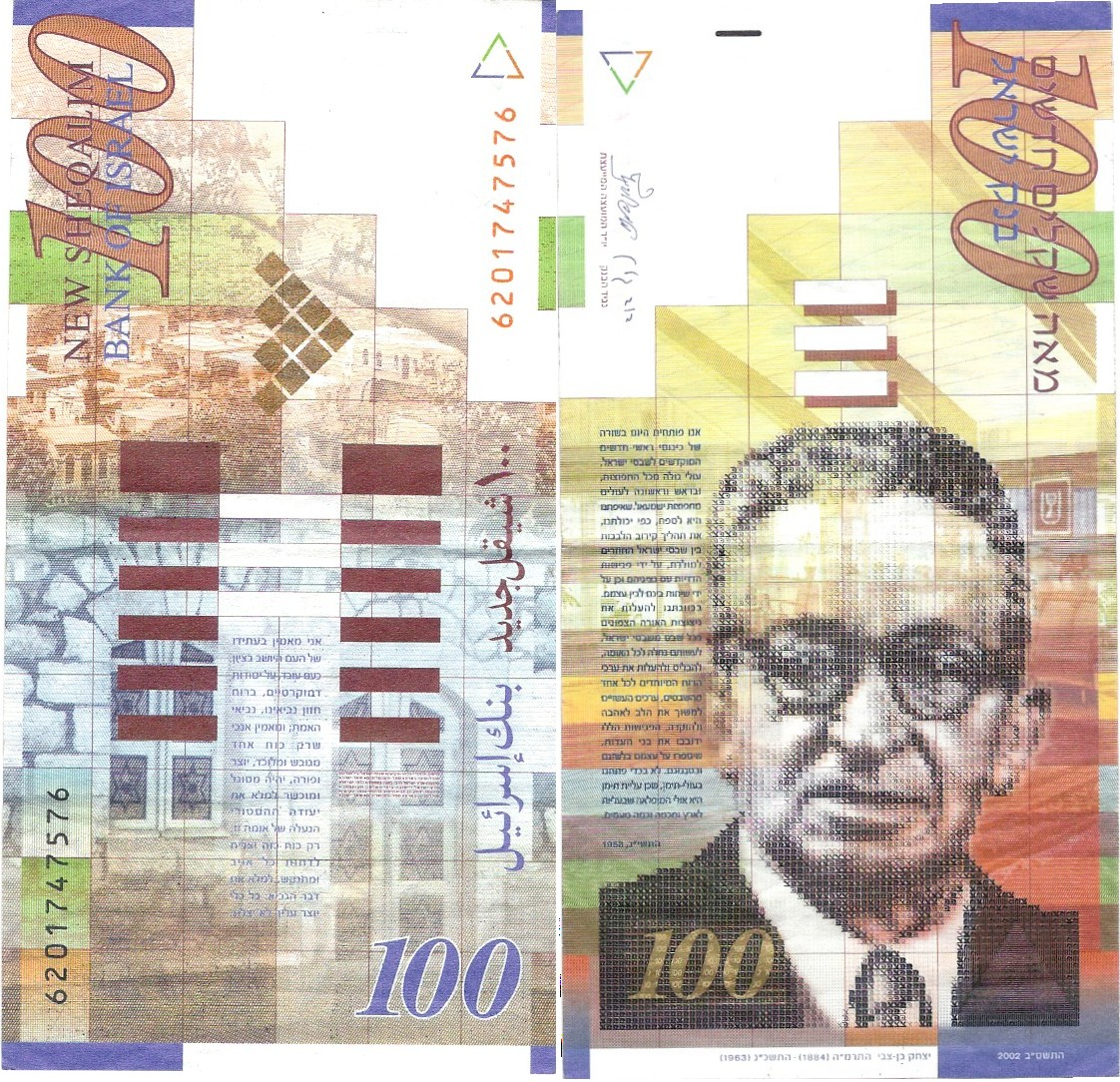
₪100 issued in 1999 (New Shekel Series B banknote)

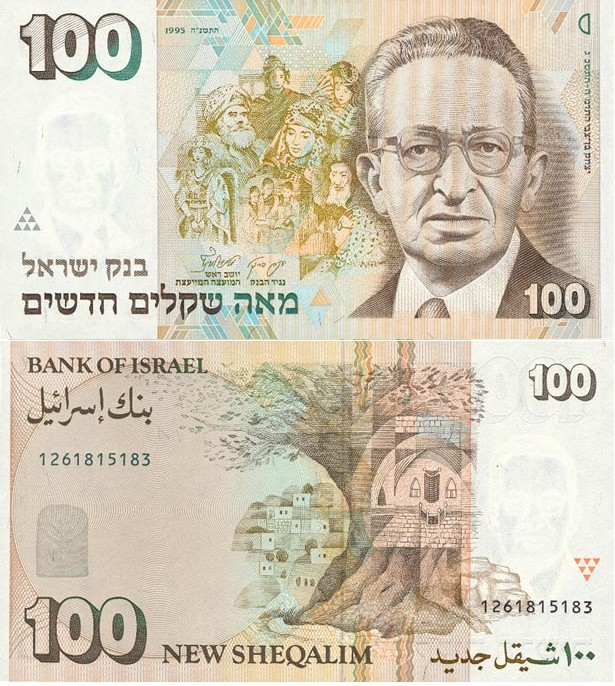
₪100 issued in 1986 (New Shekel Series A banknote)

==== Obverse ====
Portrait of Itzhak Ben-Zvi; to the right, In nine lines legible under a magnifying glass, the titles of his nine books; a background depicting a group of people representing different ethnic communities in Israel: the denomination "One Hundred New Sheqalim" and "Bank of Israel" in Hebrew.

==== Reverse ====
A view of Peki'in village, researched by Ben-Zvi, including the synagogue, a carob tree and a cave; an ancient stone candelabrum, the denomination "100 New Sheqalim" and "Bank of Israel" in Arabic and English.

==== Security Features ====
- Watermark: Portrait of Itzhak Ben-Zvi.
- Security thread: In the middle of the note.
- Look-through: A triangle on the front merges with a triangle on the back to form a Star of David when held against the light.

== Circulation ==
The current ₪100 in circulation is the Series C issued from 2017, it measures 71 x 143 mm with an orange color scheme.

The Series B issued from 1999 to 2017 and were withdrawn from circulation by 2019.The ₪100 Series A bank notes were issued from 1986 to 1999 and measured 76 x 138 mm with a brown color scheme. The ₪100 Series A bank notes were withdrawn from circulation by 2005.
