= Rachel Bluwstein =

Israeli poet

- רחל בלובשטיין
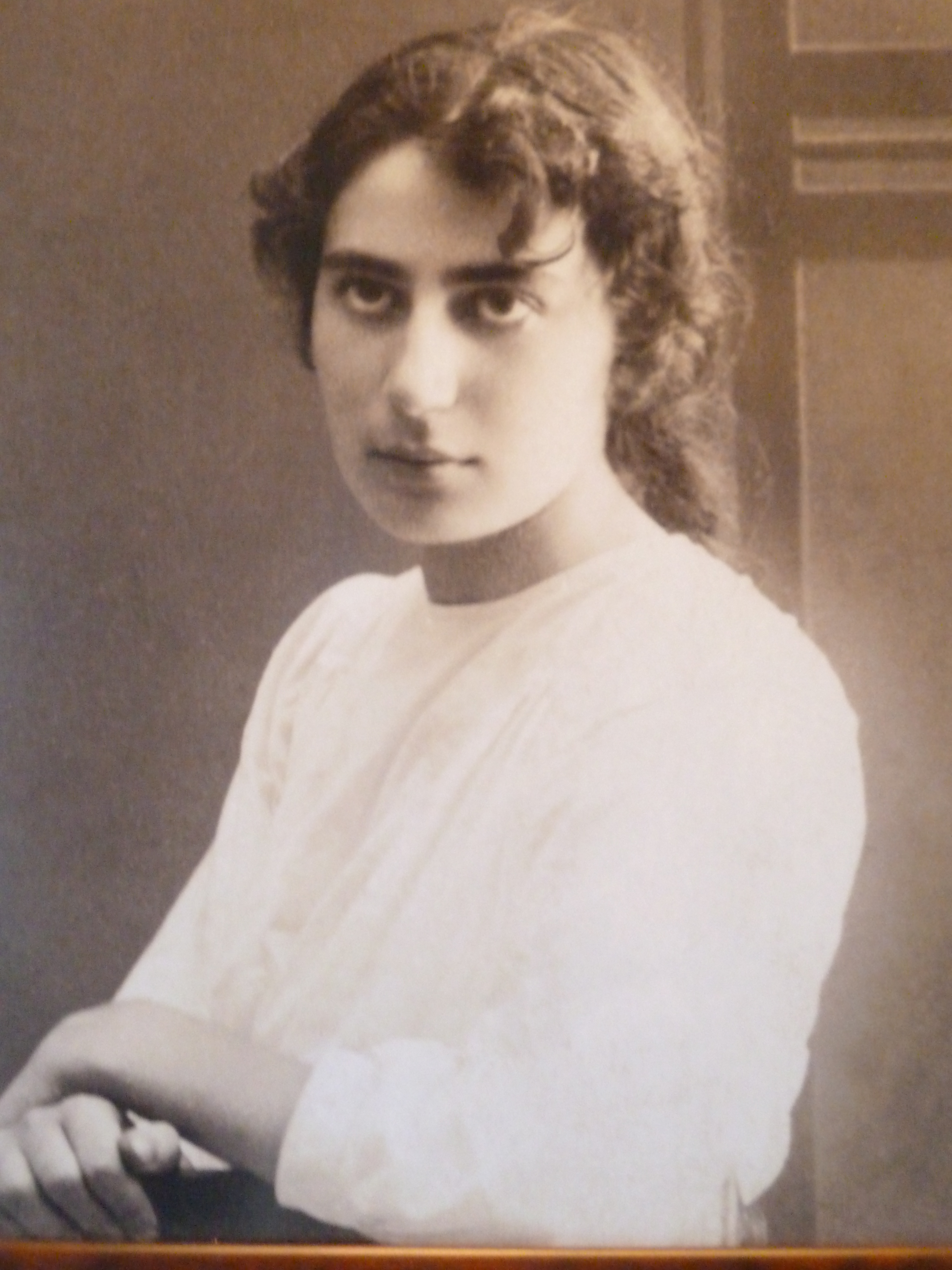
- Rachel Bluwstein
- Born: 20 September 1890; Saratov, Russian Empire
- Died: 16 April 1931 (aged 40); Tel Aviv, Mandatory Palestine
- Occupation: Poet

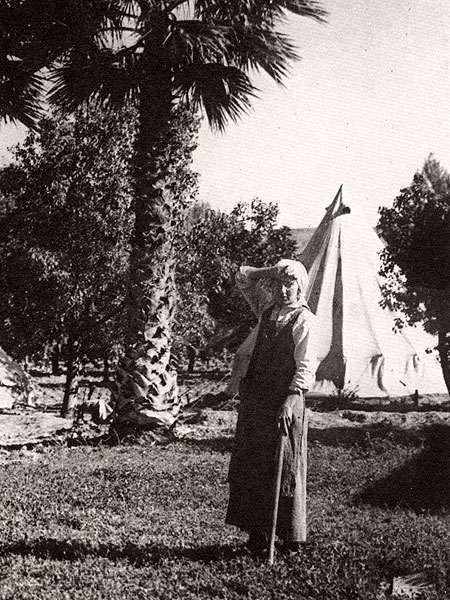
Rachel Bluwstein in kibbutz Degania Alef, 1919–1921

Rachel Bluwstein Sela (Hebrew: רחל בלובשטיין; 20 September (Julian calendar) 1890 – 16 April 1931) was a Hebrew-language poet who immigrated to Ottoman Palestine, in 1909. She is known by her first name, Rachel (Hebrew: רחל [ʁaˈχel]), or as Rachel the Poetess (רחל המשוררת [ʁaˈχel (h)am(e)ʃoˈʁeʁet]). She is featured on Israel's 20 Shekel Banknote.

== Biography ==
Rachel was born in Saratov in Imperial Russia on 20 September 1890, the eleventh daughter of Isser-Leib and Sophia Bluwstein, and granddaughter of the rabbi of the Jewish community in Kiev. During her childhood, her family moved to Poltava, Russian Empire, where she attended a Russian-speaking Jewish school and, later, a secular high school. She began writing poetry at the age of 15. When she was 17, she moved to Kiev and began studying painting.

At the age of 19, Rachel visited Ottoman Palestine, with her sister Shoshana, en route to Italy, where they were planning to study art and philosophy. They decided to stay on as Zionist pioneers, learning Hebrew by listening to children’s chatter in kindergartens. They settled in Rehovot and worked in the orchards. Later, Rachel moved to Kvutzat Kinneret on the shores of the Sea of Galilee, where she studied and worked in a women's agricultural school. At Kinneret, she met Zionist leader A. D. Gordon who was to be a great influence on her life, and to whom she dedicated her first Hebrew poem.

In 1913, on the advice of Gordon, she journeyed to Toulouse, France to study agronomy and drawing. When World War I broke out, unable to return to Ottoman Palestine, she returned instead to Russia where she taught Jewish refugee children. In Russia she suffered from poverty and strenuous labour, as well as the reappearance of her childhood lung disease. It may have been at this point in her life that she contracted tuberculosis. In 1919, after the war, she boarded the first ship to leave Russia to Israel.

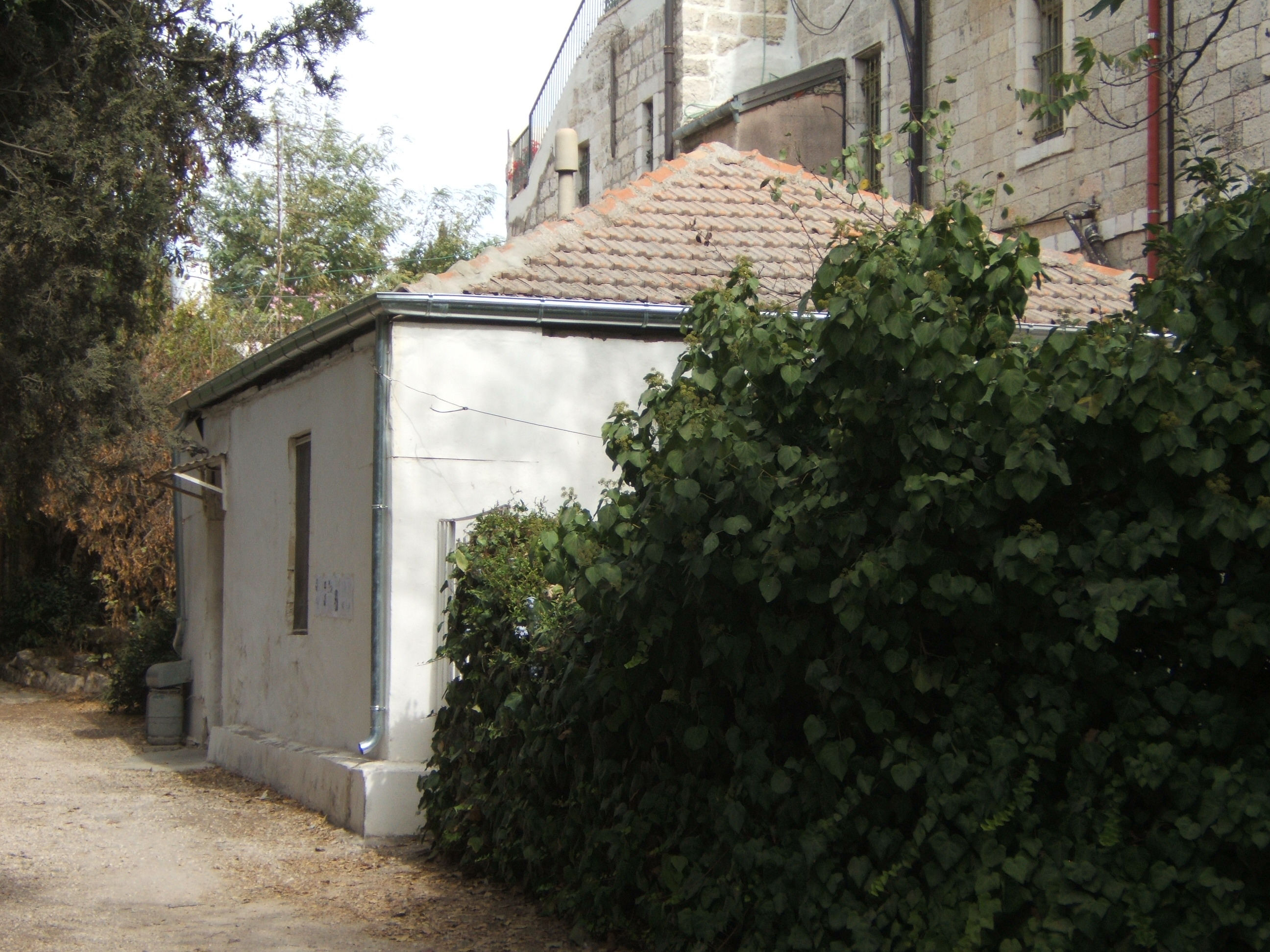
Rachel's House in No. 64 Street of the Prophets in Jerusalem

She returned to Palestine on board the ship Ruslan, dubbed the Mayflower of Israeli culture since along with Rachel, the historian Joseph Klausner, the artist Yitzhak Frenkel and the architect Zeev Rechter amongst others immigrated to Palestine. and for a while joined the small agricultural kibbutz Degania, a settlement neighbouring her previous home at Kinneret. However, shortly after her arrival she was diagnosed with tuberculosis, then an incurable disease. Now unable to work with children for fear of contagion, she was expelled from Degania and left to fend for herself. In 1925 she lived briefly in a small white house in the courtyard of the William Holman Hunt House at No. 64 Street of the Prophets in Jerusalem. She spent the rest of her life traveling and living in Tel Aviv, eking out a living by providing private lessons in Hebrew and French, and finally settled in a sanatorium for tuberculosis patients in Gedera.

Rachel died on 16 April 1931 in Tel Aviv, at the age of 40. She is buried in the Kinneret Cemetery by Moshavat Kinneret in a grave overlooking the Sea of Galilee, following her wishes as expressed in her poem If Fate Decrees. Alongside her are buried many of the socialist ideologues and pioneers of the second and third waves of immigration. Naomi Shemer was buried near Rachel, according to Shemer's wish.

== Literary career ==
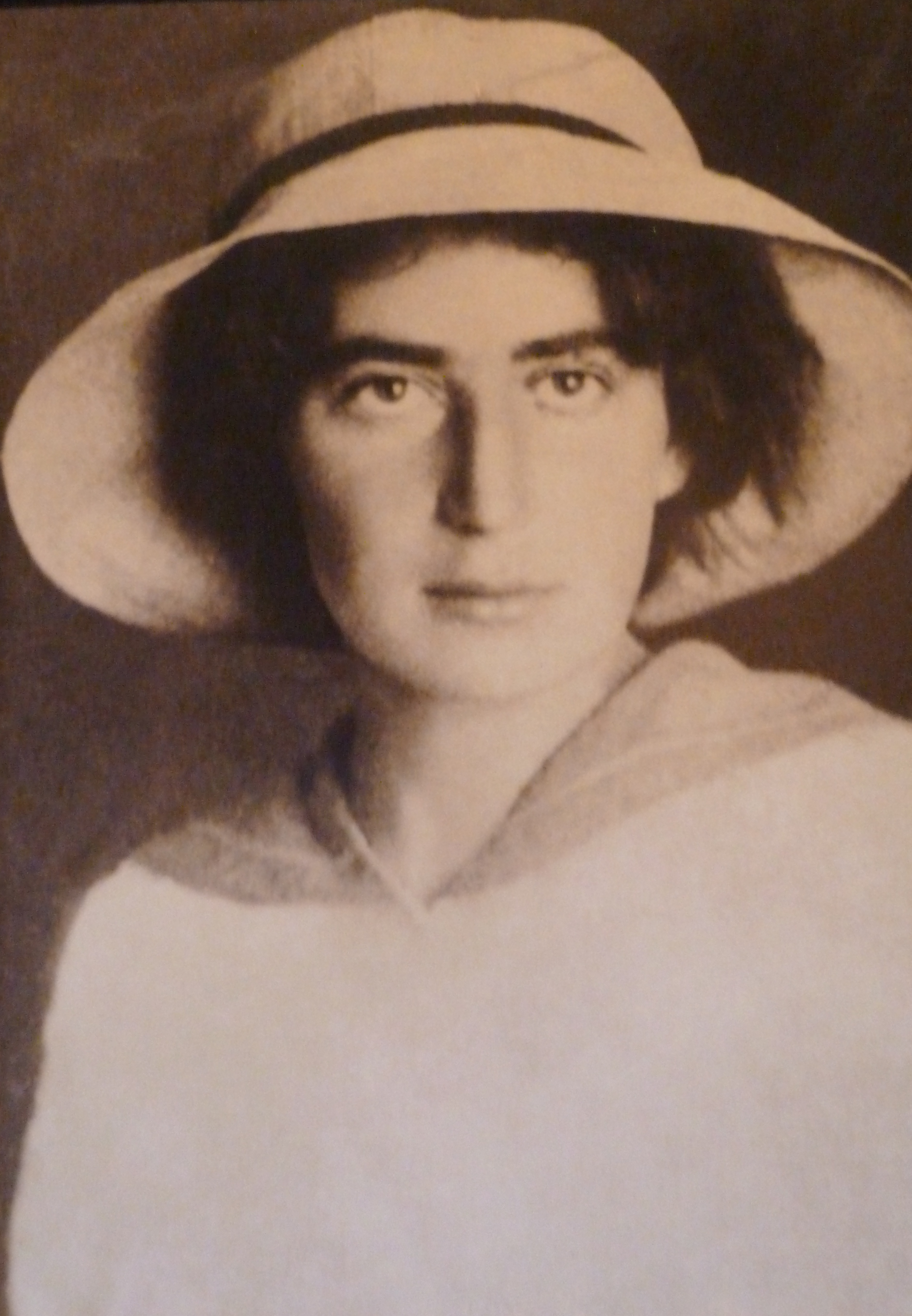
Rachel the poetess

As a member of the editorial staff of Davar newspaper, Zalman Rubashov (later Zalman Shazar, who became the third President of Israel) encouraged her to write and publish her poetry.

Her early work was in Russian, but she switched to Hebrew. Most of her poems were written in the final six years of her life, usually on small notes to her friends. In 1920, her first poem, “Mood”, was published in Davar. Eventually, the majority of her poems were published there on a weekly basis, and quickly became popular with the Jewish community in Palestine and, later, the State of Israel.

Rachel is known for her lyrical style, the brevity of her poems, and the revolutionary simplicity of her conversational tone. The majority of her poetry is set in the pastoral countryside of the Land of Israel. Many of her poems echo her feelings of longing and loss, a result of her inability to realise her aspirations in life. In several poems, she mourns the fact that she will never have a child of her own. Lyrical, exceedingly musical, and characterised by its simple language and deep feeling, her poetry deals with fate, her own difficult life, and death. Her love poems emphasise the feelings of loneliness, distance, and longing for the beloved. They also touch upon the hardships and laments of a pioneer reminiscing upon times spent working the land. Her lighter poetry is ironic and often comic. Her writing was influenced by French imagism, Biblical stories, and the literature of the Second Aliyah pioneers. Another major creative influence on Rachel’s poetry was the Acmeists and their leader, the Russian poet Anna Akhmatova. Rachel’s style reflects the movement’s strive for “clarity, accuracy, conciseness, and economy of language” in poetry.

In some poems, Rachel expresses identification with Biblical figures such as Rachel, her namesake matriarch, and Michal, wife of David.

Rachel also wrote a one-act comic play Mental Satisfaction, which was performed but not published in her lifetime. This ironic vignette of pioneer life was recently rediscovered and published in a literary journal.

== Awards and recognition ==
Rachel was the first Jewish woman poet in the British Mandate of Palestine to receive recognition in a genre that was practiced solely by men. Anthologies of her poetry remain bestsellers to this day. Many of her poems were set to music, both during her lifetime and afterwards, and are widely sung by Israeli singers. Her poems are included in the mandatory curriculum in Israeli schools. A selection of her poetry was translated to English and published under the title Flowers of Perhaps: Selected Poems of Ra'hel, by the London publisher Menard. Poems by Rachel have been translated to English, German, Czech, Polish, Esperanto, Italian, Serbo-Croatian, Hungarian, Basque (by Benito Lertxundi) and Slovak and French (by Bernard Grasset)

In his foreword to the 1994 edition of Flowers of Perhaps, the acclaimed Israeli poet Yehuda Amichai stated: "What may be most remarkable about the poetry of Ra'hel, a superb lyric poet, is that it has remained fresh in its simplicity and inspiration for more than seventy years."

In 2011, Rachel was chosen as one of four great poets whose portraits would be on Israeli currency (the other three being Leah Goldberg, Shaul Tchernichovsky, and Nathan Alterman).

In 2016, Google Doodle commemorated her 126th birthday.

== Published works ==
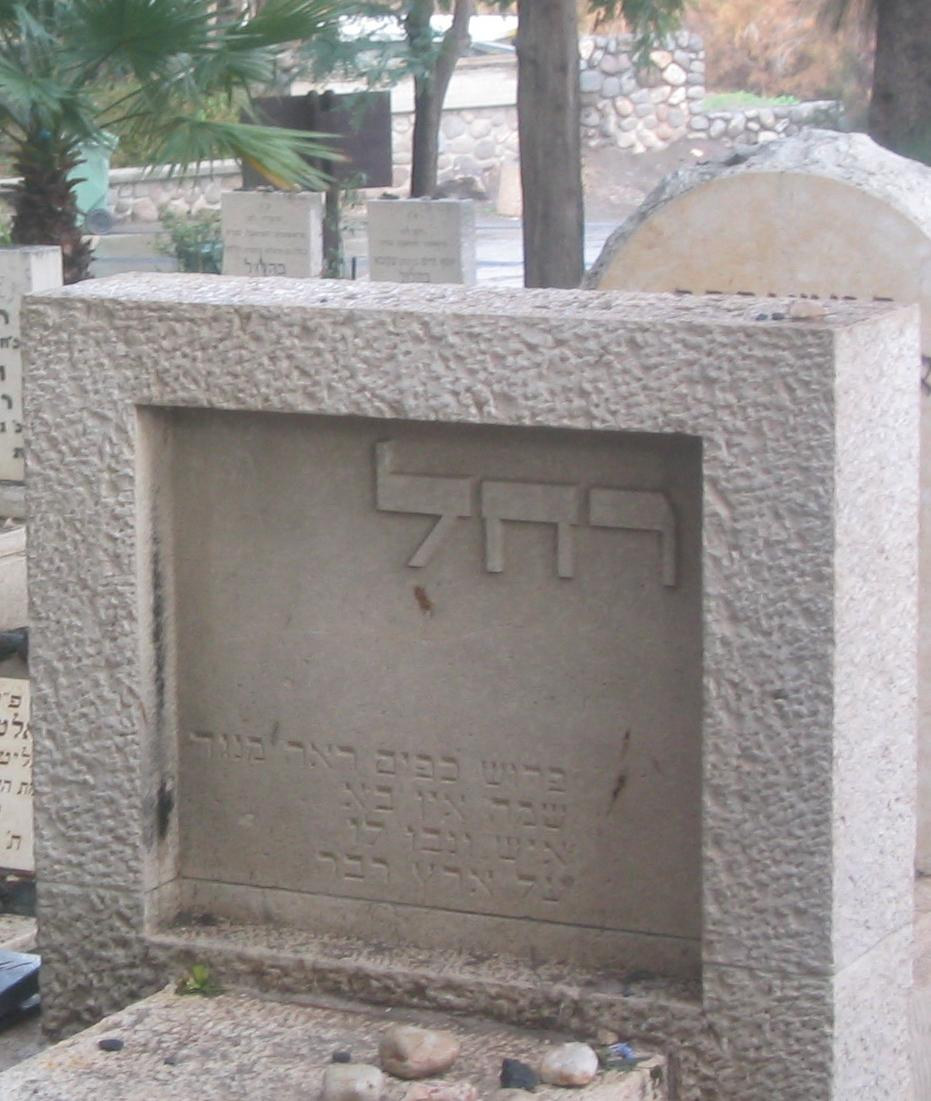
Rachel's grave at the Kineret cemetery

=== Poetry books published in Hebrew ===
- Aftergrowth, Davar, 1927 (Safiah, ספיח)
- Across From, Davar, 1930 (Mineged, מנגד)
- Nevo, Davar, 1932 (Nevo, נבו)

=== Later Hebrew editions and compilations ===
- Poems, Davar, 1935 (Shirat Rachel, שירת רחל)
- The Poems and Letters of Rachel, in Manuscript, Hotza'at Kineret, 1969 (Shirei Rachel u-Mikhtaveiha bi-Khtav Yada שירי רחל ומכתביה בכתב ידה)
- Inside and Outside Home (children), Sifriat Poalim, 1974 (Ba-Bayit U Va-Hutz, בבית ובחוץ)
- As Rachel Waited, Tamuz, 1982 [Ke-Chakot Rachel, כחכות רחל]
- Poems, Letters, Writings, Dvir, 1985 (Shirim, Mikhtavim, Reshimot, שירים, מכתבים, רשימות)
- In My Garden, Tamuz, 1985 (Be-Gani Neta`atikha, בגני נטעתיך)
- Will You Hear My Voice, Bar, 1986 (Ha-Tishma Koli, התשמע קולי)
- Rachel's Poems, Sridot, 1997 (Shirei Rachel, שירי רחל)

=== Translations ===
- English: Flowers of Perhaps: Selected Poems of Rahel London, Menard, 1995, ISBN 1-874320-02-0
- Finnish: Lähellä kaikki kaukaisuus: Runoja Basam Books, 2021, ISBN 978-952-733-700-4
- German: Berlin, Hechalutz, 1936; Tel Aviv, Davar, 1970
- Spanish: Barcelona, Riopiedras, 1985
- Yiddish: Winnipeg, WIZO U.S.A. and Canada, 1932
- Buenos Aires, Kium Farlag, 1957

Individual poems have been published in Afrikaans, Arabic, Chinese, Dutch, English, Esperanto, French, Frisian, German, Greek, Hungarian, Italian, Japanese, Portuguese, Romanian, Serbo-Croatian, Slovak, Spanish, Ukrainian, Vietnamese, Welsh, and Yiddish.

=== Books about Rachel ===
- Biography in French: " Quand Israël rêvait. La vie de Rachel Bluwstein." Author: Martine Gozlan. Editor: Le Cerf, Paris, 2018

== Selected poems ==
Our Garden

Spring and early morning –
do you remember that spring, that day? –
our garden at the foot of Mount Carmel,
facing the blue of the bay?

You are standing under an olive,
and I, like a bird on a spray,
am perched on the silvery tree-top.
We are cutting black branches away.

From below, your saw’s rhythmic buzzing
reaches me in my tree,
and I rain down from above you
fragments of poetry.

Remember that morning, that happiness?
They were – and disappeared,
like the short spring of our country,
the short spring of our years.

Barren

Oh, if I had a son, a little son,
with black curled hair and clever eyes,
A little son to walk with in the garden
under morning skies
a son,
a little son.

I'd call him Uri, little laughing Uri,
a tender name, as light, as full of joy
as sunlight on the dew, as tripping on the tongue
as the laughter of a boy -
"Uri"
I'd call him.

And still I wait, as mother Rachel waited,
or Hannah at Shiloh, she the barren one,
until the day comes when my lips whisper,
"Uri, my son."

Ra'hel's Book

By her grave her book
dangles from a chain,
as if the words had not
already flown,
and sown,
in hearts everywhere,
seeds of song.
Nurtured by despair
they flower there.

== See also ==
- Esther Raab (1894–1981), friend and author of Hebrew prose and poetry, known as "the first Sabra poet" (sabra meaning 'born in the Land of Israel')
