= Israeli new shekel =

Currency of Israel

New Israeli shekel
שקל חדש (Hebrew); شيكل جديد (Arabic); NIS
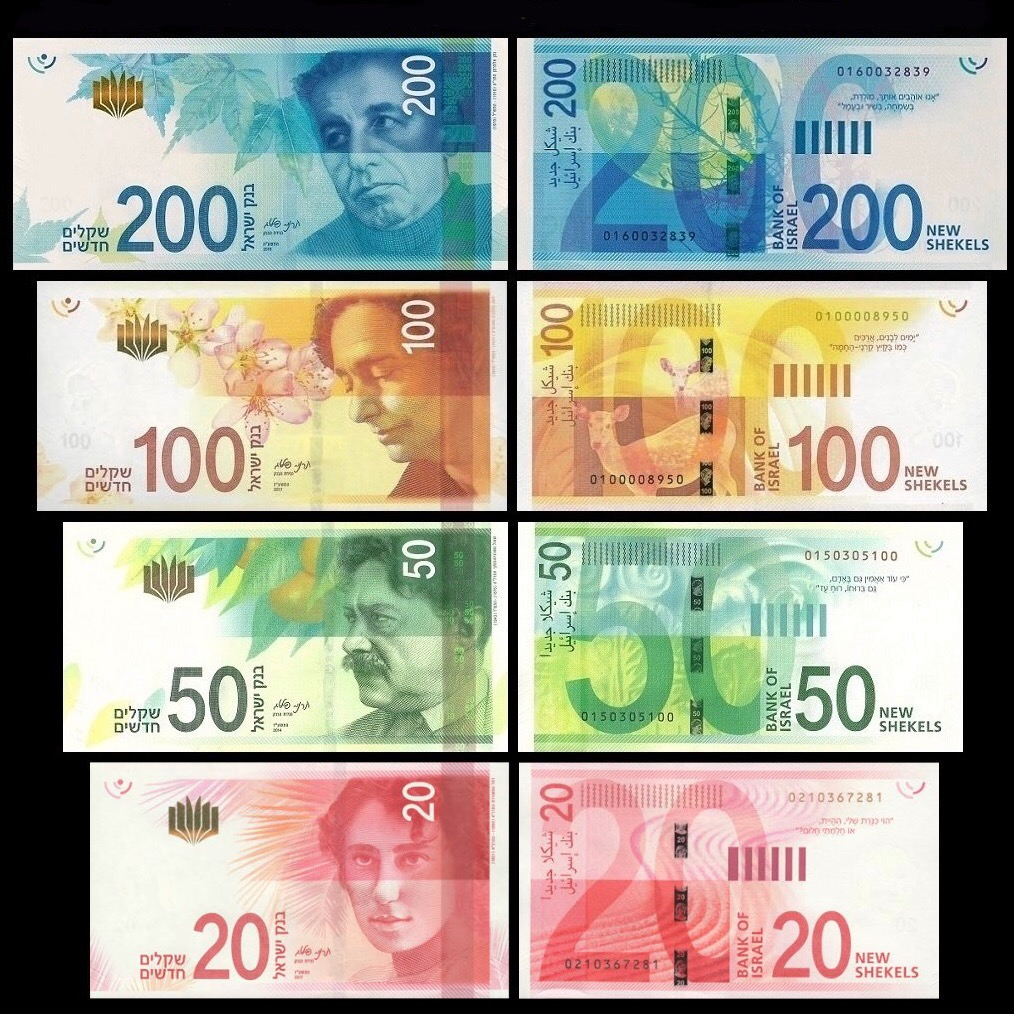
- New shekel banknotes (Current Series C)

ISO 4217
- Code: ILS (numeric: 376)
- Subunit: 0.01

Units of account
- Base unit: shekel
- Plural: shekels; sheqalim
- Symbol: ₪
- Subunit
- 1/100: agora
- Plural
- agora: agoras; agorot

Denominations
- Banknotes: ₪20, ₪50, ₪100, ₪200
- Coins: 10 agorot, ₪1/2, ₪1, ₪2, ₪5, ₪10

Demographics
- Date of introduction: 1 January 1986
- Replaced: Old Israeli shekel
- Official user(s): Israel
- Unofficial user: Palestinian Authority

Issuance
- Central bank: Bank of Israel
- Website: boi.org.il
- Printer: Orell Füssli
- Mint: KOMSCO

Valuation
- Inflation: ▼−0.59% (2020) ▲0.35% (2021 est.)
- Source: Bank of Israel, Statista, April 2021

The new Israeli shekel (Note: Hebrew: שֶׁקֶל חָדָשׁ, romanized: sheqel ẖadash, pronounced [ˈʃekel χaˈdaʃ]; Arabic: شيكل جديد, romanized: šēkal jadīd) (sign: ₪; ISO code: ILS; unofficial abbreviation: NIS), also known as simply the Israeli shekel, (Note: Hebrew: שקל ישראלי, romanized: sheqel yisreʾeli; Arabic: شيكل إسرائيلي, romanized: šēkal ʾisrāʾīlī) is the currency of Israel and is also used as a de facto legal tender in the Palestinian territories of the West Bank and the Gaza Strip.

Each shekel, the base unit, is divided into 100 agorot. The new shekel has been in use since 1 January 1986, when it replaced the hyperinflated old shekel at a ratio of 1000:1.

The currency sign for the new shekel ⟨ ₪ ⟩ is a combination of the first Hebrew letters of the words shekel (ש) and ẖadash (ח) (new). When the shekel sign is unavailable the abbreviation NIS (ש״ח and ش.ج) is used.

== History ==
The origin of the name "shekel" (שֶׁקֶל) is from the ancient Biblical currency by the same name. An early Biblical reference is Abraham being reported to pay "four hundred shekels of silver" to Ephron the Hittite for the Cave of the Patriarchs in Hebron (Genesis 23:15–16). Shekel is any of several ancient units of weight or of currency in ancient Israel, from the Hebrew root ש־ק־ל (š-q-l) meaning 'weigh' (שָׁקַל šaqal 'to weigh', שֶׁקֶל šeqel 'a standard weight'), common with other Semitic languages like Akkadian (resp. šaqālu and šiqlu) and Aramaic (resp. תְּקַל teqal and תִּקְלָא tiqla). Initially, it may have referred to a weight of barley. In ancient Israel, the shekel was known to be about 180 grains (11 grams or 0.35 troy ounces).

From the formation of the modern State of Israel on 14 May 1948 through 1952 banknotes continued to be issued by the Anglo-Palestine Bank as the Palestine pound which was pegged at £P1 = £1 sterling. In 1952, the Anglo-Palestine Bank changed its name to Bank Leumi Le-Yisrael (Hebrew: בנק לאומי לישראל, 'National Bank of Israel') and the currency name became the Israeli pound.

=== Israeli pound (1952–1980) ===
The Israeli pound (לירה ישראלית, lira yisraelit) was the currency of the State of Israel from June 1952 until it was replaced with the shekel on 24 February 1980. From 1955, after the Bank of Israel was established and took over the duty of issuing banknotes, only the Hebrew name was used, along with the symbol "IL". The pegging to sterling was abandoned on 1 January 1954, and in 1960, the sub-division of the Israeli pound was changed from 1,000 prutot to 100 agorot.

Because lira (Hebrew: לִירָה) was a loanword from Latin, a debate emerged in the 1960s over the name of the Israeli currency due to its non-Hebrew origins. This resulted in a law ordering the Minister of Finance to change the name from lira to the Hebrew name shekel (Hebrew: שקל). The law allowed the minister to decide on the date for the change. The law came into effect in February 1980, when the Israeli government introduced the 'Israeli shekel' (now called old Israeli shekel), at a rate of IL10 = IS 1.

=== Shekel (1980–1985) ===
The original shekel, now known as the old shekel, was the currency of the State of Israel between 24 February 1980 and 31 December 1985. Both it and its predecessor, the Israeli pound, experienced frequent devaluations against foreign currencies during the 1960s and 1970s. This trend culminated in the old shekel experiencing hyperinflation in the early 1980s. After inflation was contained as a result of the 1985 Economic Stabilization Plan, the new shekel was introduced, replacing the old shekel on 1 January 1986 at a rate of IS 1,000 to ₪1.

=== New shekel (1985–present) ===
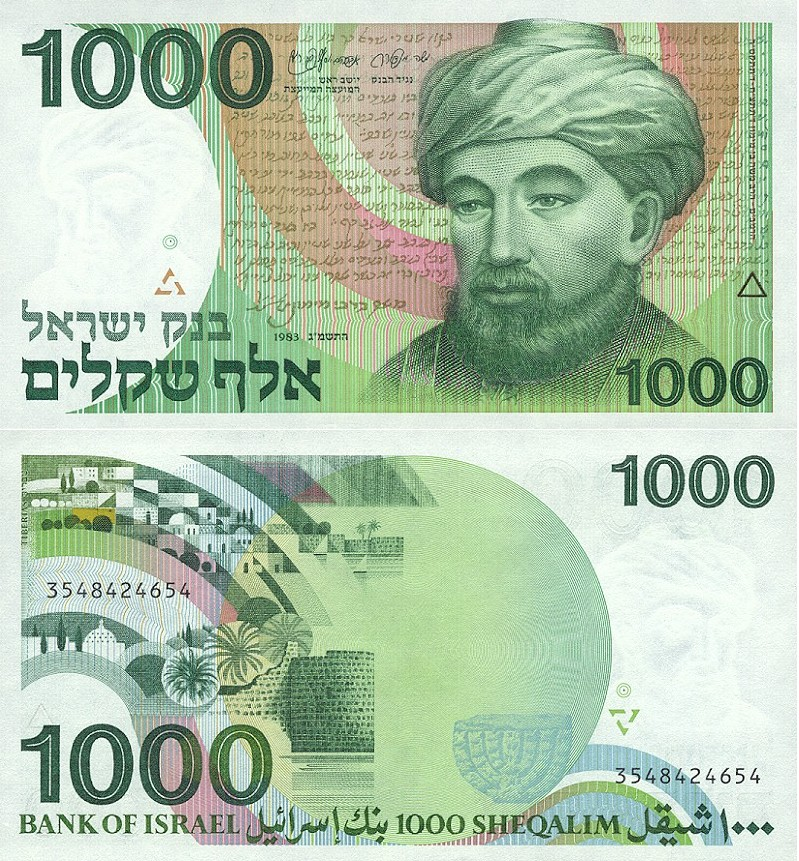
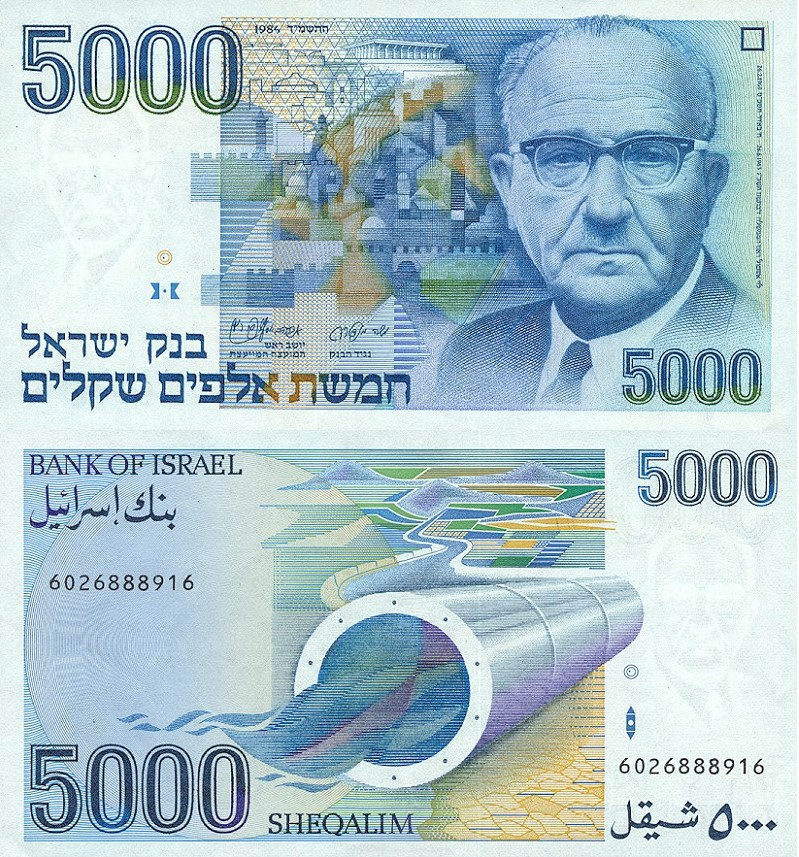
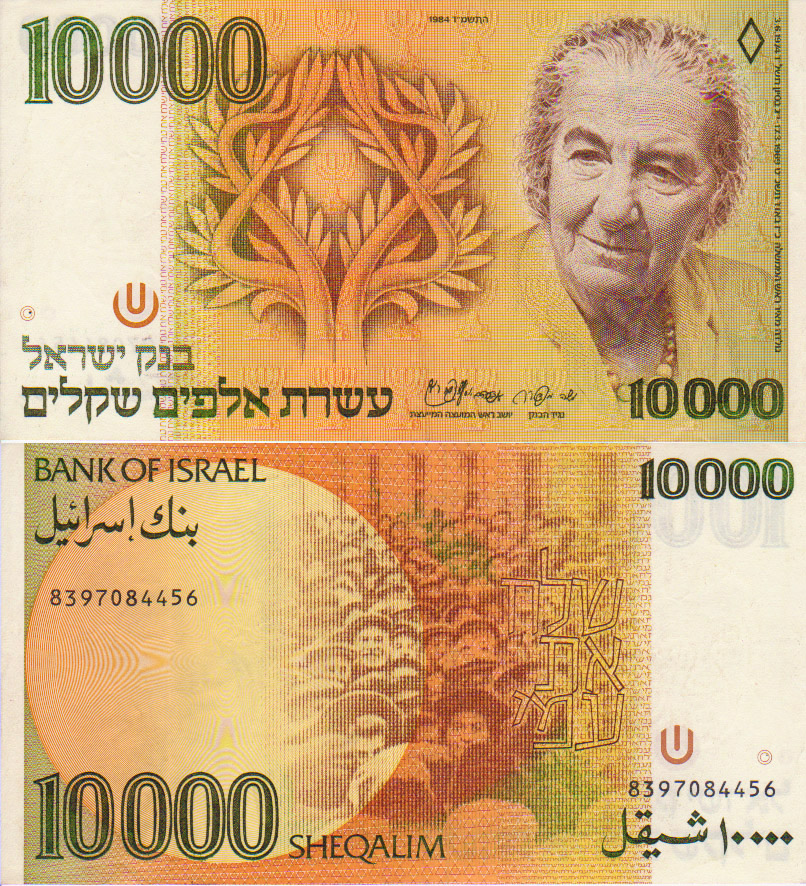
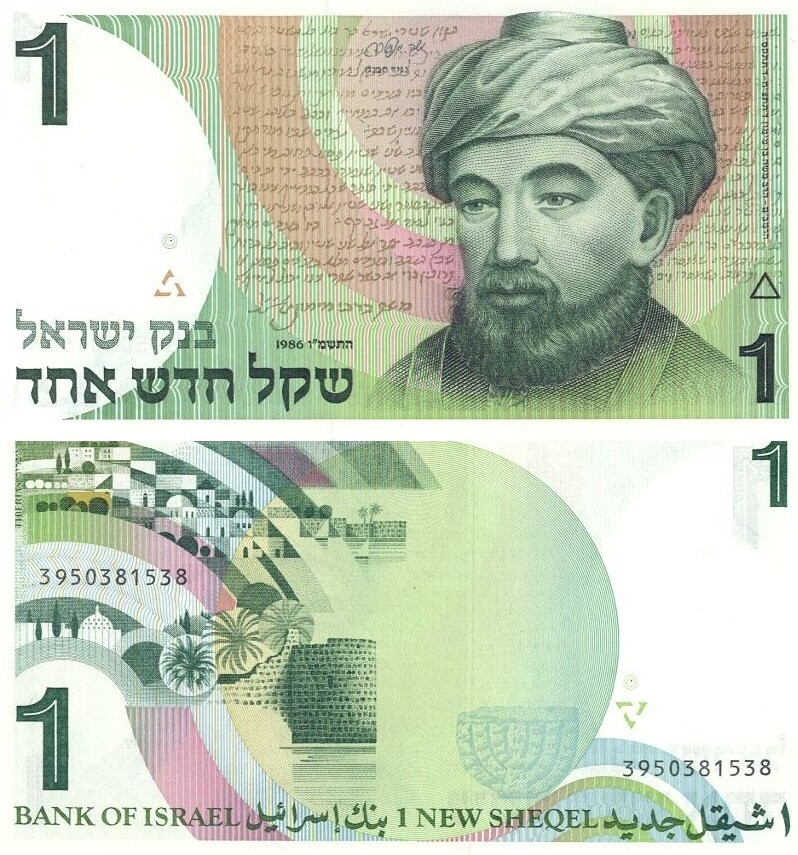
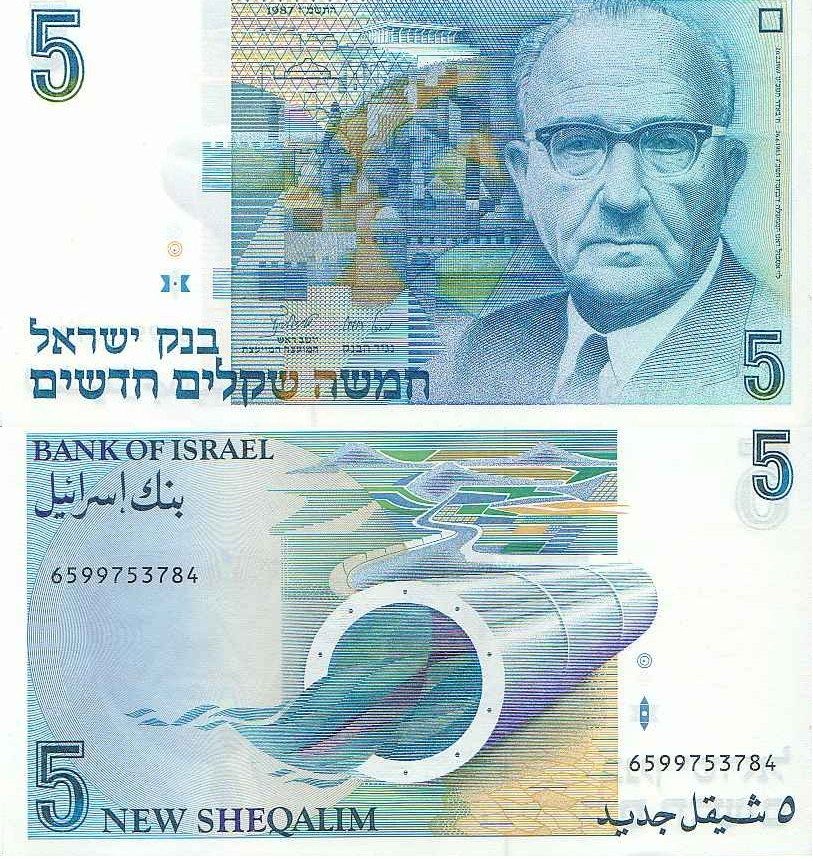
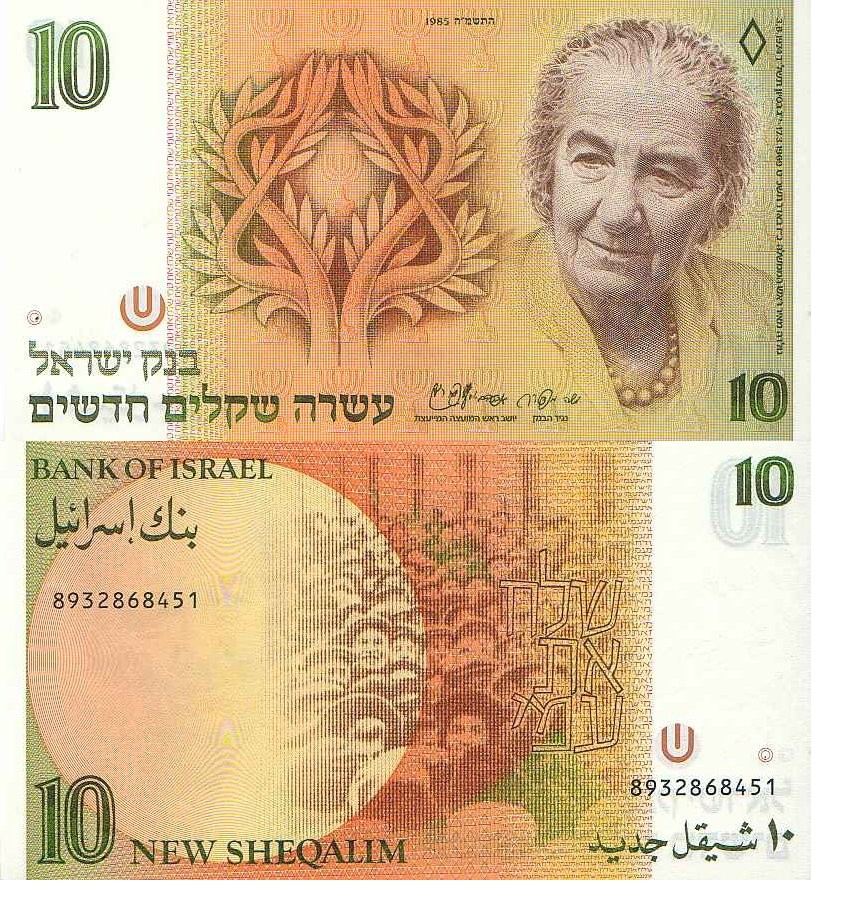
Removing three zeros: The smallest of the new banknotes (below) correspond to the biggest of the old (above).

Since the economic crisis of the 1980s and the subsequent introduction of the new shekel in 1985, the Bank of Israel and the government of Israel have maintained much more careful and conservative fiscal and monetary policies, and have gradually introduced various market-based economic reforms. In addition, the signing of free trade agreements helped the Israeli economy become more competitive, while heavy investment in its industrial and scientific base allowed the country to take advantage of opportunities associated with the rise of the global knowledge economy, thus greatly increasing exports and opening new markets for its products and services. As a result of these factors, inflation has been relatively low and the country now maintains a positive balance of payments, with a current account surplus equivalent to about 3% of its GDP in 2010. Consequently, its currency has strengthened though less so than an exceptional rise in the euro and Swiss franc, rising approximately 20% in value relative to the US dollar from 2001 to 2011, contrasting to weakening in prior decades.

Since 1 January 2003, the new shekel has been a freely convertible currency. Since 7 May 2006, new shekel derivative trading has also been available on the Chicago Mercantile Exchange. This makes the new shekel one of only twenty or so world currencies for which there are widely available currency futures contracts in the foreign exchange market. It is also a currency that can be exchanged by consumers in many parts of the world. On 26 May 2008, CLS Bank International announced that it would settle payment instructions in new shekels, making the currency fully convertible. The shekel in modern times is often highly volatile, caused by Israel's policies, with many countries since 2023 refusing to economically cooperate with Israel.

== Coins ==
In 1985, coins in denominations of 1 agora, 5 agorot, 10 agorot, ₪1/2, and ₪1 were introduced. In 1990, ₪5 coins were introduced, followed by ₪10 coins in 1995. Production of 1 agora pieces ceased in 1990, and they were removed from circulation on 1 April 1991. A ₪2 coin was introduced on 9 December 2007. The 5 agorot coin, last minted in 2007, was removed from circulation on 1 January 2008.

In April 2011, it was reported that new coins would be minted that would use less metal and thus lower costs. Counterfeiting would also be harder. The Bank of Israel is considering dropping the word "new" on the planned coins series. If approved, this would be the first replacement of all coins since the introduction of the new shekel coins in September 1985. The coins are minted by the Korea Minting and Security Printing Corporation (KOMSCO).

In 2022, the Bank of Israel announced a new series of coins featuring updated inscriptions for its coins, with "new shekels" replacing "new sheqalim". The 5 and 10 new shekel coins will be the first to feature the new inscriptions, and the 10 agorot and 1/2 new shekel coins will feature its unit names rendered in Arabic.

New shekel coin series
Image	Value	Technical parameters				Description			Date of	
Image	Value	Diameter	Thickness	Mass	Composition	Edge	Obverse	Reverse	issue	withdrawal
	1 agora	17 mm	1.2 mm	2 g	Aluminium bronze 92% copper 6% aluminium 2% nickel	Plain	Ancient galley, "Israel" in Hebrew, Arabic and English	Value, date	4 September 1985	1 April 1991
	5 agorot	19.5 mm	1.3 mm	3 g	Aluminium bronze 92% copper 6% aluminium 2% nickel	Plain	Replica of a coin from the fourth year of the war of the Jews against Rome depicting a lulav between two etrogim, "Israel" in Hebrew, Arabic and English	Value, date	4 September 1985	1 January 2008
	10 agorot	22 mm	1.5 mm	4 g	Aluminium bronze 92% copper 6% aluminium 2% nickel	Plain	Replica of a coin issued by Antigonus II Mattathias with the seven-branched candelabrum, the state emblem, "Israel" in Hebrew, Arabic and English	Value, date	4 September 1985	Current
	₪0.5	26 mm	1.6 mm	6.5 g	Aluminium bronze 92% copper 6% aluminium 2% nickel	Plain	Lyre	Value, date, "Israel" in Hebrew, Arabic and English	4 September 1985	Current
	₪1	18 mm	1.8 mm	3.5 g	Cupronickel; 75% copper 25% nickel (1985–1993); Nickel-plated steel (1994–present)	Plain	Lily, "Yehud" in ancient Hebrew	Value, date, "Israel" in Hebrew, Arabic and English	4 September 1985	Current
	₪2	21.6 mm	2.3 mm	5.7 g	Nickel-plated steel	Segmented (plain and reeded sections)	Two cornucopia	Value, date, "Israel" in Hebrew, Arabic and English	9 December 2007	Current
	₪5	24 mm	2.4 mm	8.2 g	Cupronickel; 75% copper 25% nickel	12 sides	Capital of column	Value, date, "Israel" in Hebrew, Arabic and English	2 January 1990	Current
	₪10	23 mm Core: 16 mm	2.2 mm	7 g	Ring: nickel-bonded steel Center: aureate-bonded bronze	Reeded	Palm tree with seven leaves and two baskets with dates, the words "for the redemption of Zion" in ancient and modern Hebrew alphabet	Value, date, "Israel" in Hebrew, Arabic and English	7 February 1995	Current
For table standards, see the coin specification table.

- Note that all dates on Israeli coins are given in the Hebrew calendar and are written in Hebrew numerals.

== Banknotes ==
=== Series A (1985–1999) ===
Beginning on 4 September 1985. banknotes are introduced in denominations of ₪5, ₪10, and ₪50. A ₪1 note followed on 8 May 1986 and the ₪100 note issued on 19 August 1986. On 2 April 1988, the ₪20 note issued and the ₪200 note issued on 16 February 1992 completing the family. The ₪1, ₪5 and ₪10 notes used the same basic designs as the earlier IS 1000, 5000, and 10 000 notes but with the denominations altered.

The ₪1, ₪5 and ₪10 notes were later replaced by coins. A number of these coins, in their first minting, had the images of the individuals on the notes engraved on them.

Image	Value	Dimensions	Colour	Obverse	Reverse	Date of issue	Date of withdrawal
	₪1	76×138 mm	green	Maimonides	Tiberias where Maimonides is buried; ancient stone lamp	8 May 1986	1995
	₪5	76×138 mm	blue	Levi Eshkol	Pipe carrying water, symbolizing the National Water Carrier, fields and barren land in background	4 September 1985	1995
	₪10	76×138 mm	orange	Golda Meir	Picture of Golda Meir in the crowd, in front of the Moscow Choral Synagogue, as she arrived in Moscow as Israel's ambassador in 1948	4 September 1985	1995
	₪20	76×138 mm	dark gray	Moshe Sharett	The original building of Herzliya Gymnasium, Little Tel Aviv in background	2 April 1988	1 July 2000
	₪50	76×138 mm	purple	Shmuel Yosef Agnon	Jerusalem skyline, Eastern European shtetl, the setting of many of Agnon's stories.	4 September 1985	1 July 2000
	₪100	76×138 mm	brown	Yitzhak Ben-Zvi	Peki'in Synagogue with carob tree and cave; ancient stone lamp	19 August 1986	1 July 2000
	₪200	76×138 mm	red	Zalman Shazar	A girl writing at a desk as a symbol of the Compulsory Education Law which was initiated by Shazar, and Hebrew block letters in background	16 February 1992	1 July 2000
These images are to scale at 0.7 pixel per millimetre (18 pixel per inch). For table standards, see the banknote specification table.

=== Series B (1999–2017) ===
The Second series of bank notes was released in 1999, replacing the first series by 2005. A plan to issue a ₪500 banknote, carrying the portrait of Yitzhak Rabin, was announced shortly after Rabin's assassination in 1995. However, due to low inflation rates, there was no need for such a banknote and it was never issued.

Second series of the new shekel
Image	Value	Dimensions	Colour	Obverse	Reverse	Date of issue
	₪20	71 × 138 mm	Green	Moshe Sharett	Jewish volunteers in World War II; a watchtower, commemorating tower and stockade settlements	3 January 1999
	₪20	71 × 138 mm	Green	Moshe Sharett	Jewish volunteers in World War II; a watchtower, commemorating tower and stockade settlements. The additional red text on the polypropylene note reads "60 Years of the State of Israel" in Hebrew in red ink. It was only featured in a 1.8 million limited run close to the noted anniversary and is not present on a majority of notes. (Made of polypropylene, a polymer substrate, which is superior to the regular Series B paper note with a circulation life of a few months only. The polymer note is printed by Orell Füssli Security Printing of Zürich, Switzerland.)	13 April 2008
	₪50	71 × 138 mm	Purple	Shmuel Yosef Agnon	Agnon's notebook, pen and glasses, Jerusalem and the Temple Mount	31 October 1999
	₪100	71 × 138 mm	Brown	Yitzhak Ben-Zvi	Peki'in Synagogue	3 January 1999
	₪200	71 × 138 mm	Red	Zalman Shazar	A street in Safed and text from Shazar's essay about Safed	31 October 1999
	₪500	71 × 138 mm	Blue	Yitzhak Rabin	Part of a speech given by the late Prime Minister shortly before his assassination	Never printed
These images are to scale at 0.7 pixel per millimetre (18 pixel per inch). For table standards, see the banknote specification table.

=== Series C (2014–present) ===
The committee proposed that the new series would bear the portraits of prominent Hebrew poets, among them Rachel Bluwstein, Shaul Tchernichovsky, Leah Goldberg and Nathan Alterman. In December 2010, it was announced that the series would feature portraits of Menachem Begin, Yitzhak Rabin, Rachel, and Shmuel Yosef Agnon. When Begin's family opposed the decision, the committee's original proposal was readopted.

On 14 November 2012, the Bank of Israel announced that the new series of banknotes is in the final stages of design. The first of the new banknotes to begin circulation was in the ₪50 denomination on 16 September 2014, followed by the ₪200 note on 23 December 2015. The final two denominations, ₪20 and ₪100, were issued on 23 November 2017, completing the "Series C" banknote series.

With the issuing of the third series, the Bank of Israel has adopted the standard English spelling of shekel and plural shekels for its currency. Previously, the Bank had formally used the Hebrew transcriptions of sheqel and sheqalim (from שְׁקָלִים). The new notes also used the Arabic شيكل (šaykal) rather than شيقل (šayqal), which had been used on all banknotes previously.

The banknotes are printed by Orell Füssli Security Printing of Switzerland.

Third Series of the New Shekel
Image	Value	Dimensions	Colour	Description		Date of issue
Image	Value	Dimensions	Colour	Obverse	Reverse	Date of issue
	₪20	129 × 71 mm	Red	Rachel Bluwstein; the poem Kinneret in microprinting; palm tree branches in the background	Vista of the Sea of Galilee shoreline; segment from the poem Perhaps it was nothing...	23 November 2017
	₪50	136 × 71 mm	Green	Shaul Tchernichovsky; the poem Oh, My Land, My Homeland in microprinting; citrus tree and its fruits in the background	Capital of a Corinthian column; segment from the poem I Believe	16 September 2014
	₪100	143 × 71 mm	Orange	Leah Goldberg; the poem In the land of my love the almond tree blossoms in microprinting; almond tree blossoms in the background	A group of gazelles; segment from the poem White days	23 November 2017
	₪200	150 × 71 mm	Blue	Nathan Alterman; the poem Eternal Meeting in microprinting; fall leaves in the background	Moonlit flora; segment from the poem Morning Song	23 December 2015
These images are to scale at 0.7 pixel per millimetre (18 pixel per inch). For table standards, see the banknote specification table.

== Exchange rates ==
The cost of one euro in ILS (from 2011).

ILS per currency, averaged over the year
Currency	ISO 4217	Unit	1986	1991	1996	2001	2006	2011	2016	2021	2026
United States dollar	USD	1	1.36	2.59	3.36	4.22	4.47	3.46	3.77	3.22	
Soviet ruble	SUR^{1}	1	1.80	4.61							
Russian ruble	RUB	100			62.32	14.41	16.37	12.17	5.75	5.04	
Yen	JPY	100	0.81	1.87	3.16	3.42	4.00	4.27	3.44	2.94	
Sterling (pound)	GBP	1	2.07	4.47	5.16	6.10	8.36	5.53	5.15	4.44	
Deutsche Mark	DEM^{2}	1	0.61	1.50	2.22						
French franc	FRF^{3}	1	0.19	0.44	0.65						
Euro	EUR	1				3.63	5.65	4.91	4.25	3.82	
Swiss franc	CHF	1	0.73	1.78	2.68	2.37	3.67	4.14	3.89	3.53	
Jordanian dinar	JOD	1	4.25	3.34	4.50	5.89	6.44	4.81	5.32	4.55	
Egyptian pound	EGP	1	2.12	0.72	0.94	1.07	0.77	0.57	0.42	0.20	
Renminbi (yuan)	CNY	1	0.39	0.47	0.39	0.50	0.55	0.55	0.58	0.50	
^{1} SUR ceased to exist after 1993, and was replaced by RUB.^{2} DEM ceased to exist after 1999, and was replaced by EUR.^{3} FRF ceased to exist after 1999, and was replaced by EUR.

Current ILS exchange rates
From Google Finance:	AUD CAD CHF CNY EUR GBP HKD JPY USD JOD EGP EUR
From Yahoo! Finance:	AUD CAD CHF CNY EUR GBP HKD JPY USD JOD EGP EUR
From XE.com:	AUD CAD CHF CNY EUR GBP HKD JPY USD JOD EGP EUR
From OANDA:	AUD CAD CHF CNY EUR GBP HKD JPY USD JOD EGP EUR

== See also ==
- Bank of Israel
- Economy of Israel
