= Shaul Tchernichovsky =

Ukrainian-born Hebrew poet (1875–1943)

- שאול טשרניחובסקי
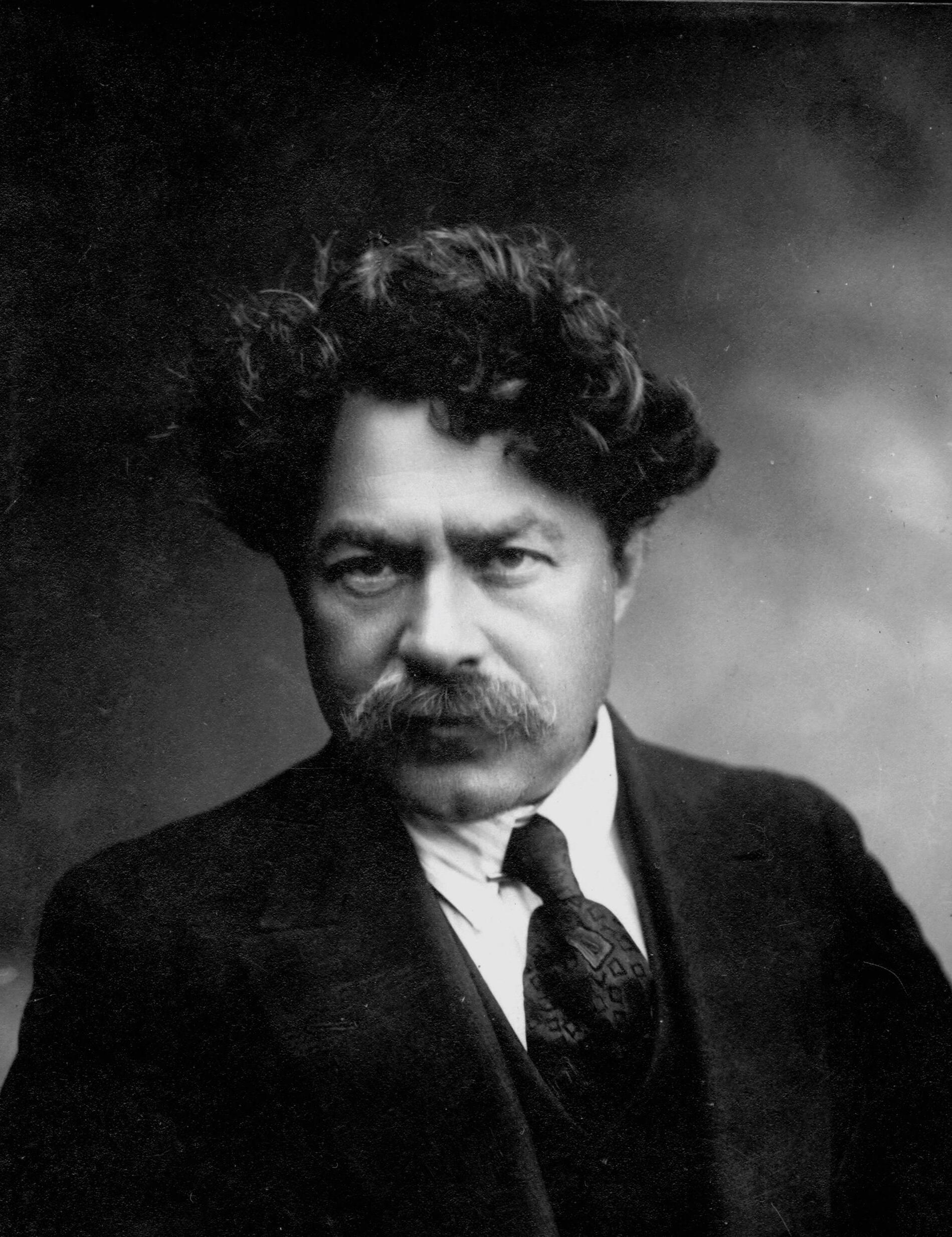
- Tchernichovsky in 1927
- Born: 20 August 1875; Mykhailivka, Taurida Governorate, Russian Empire
- Died: 14 October 1943 (aged 68); Jerusalem, British Mandate of Palestine
- Occupations: Poet, essayist, translator, doctor
- Spouse(s): Melania Karlovna Tchernichovskaia (1879–1971), née von Hosius-Horbacewicz
- Writing career
- Genres: Lyrical-erotic poetry, epic poetry

Signature
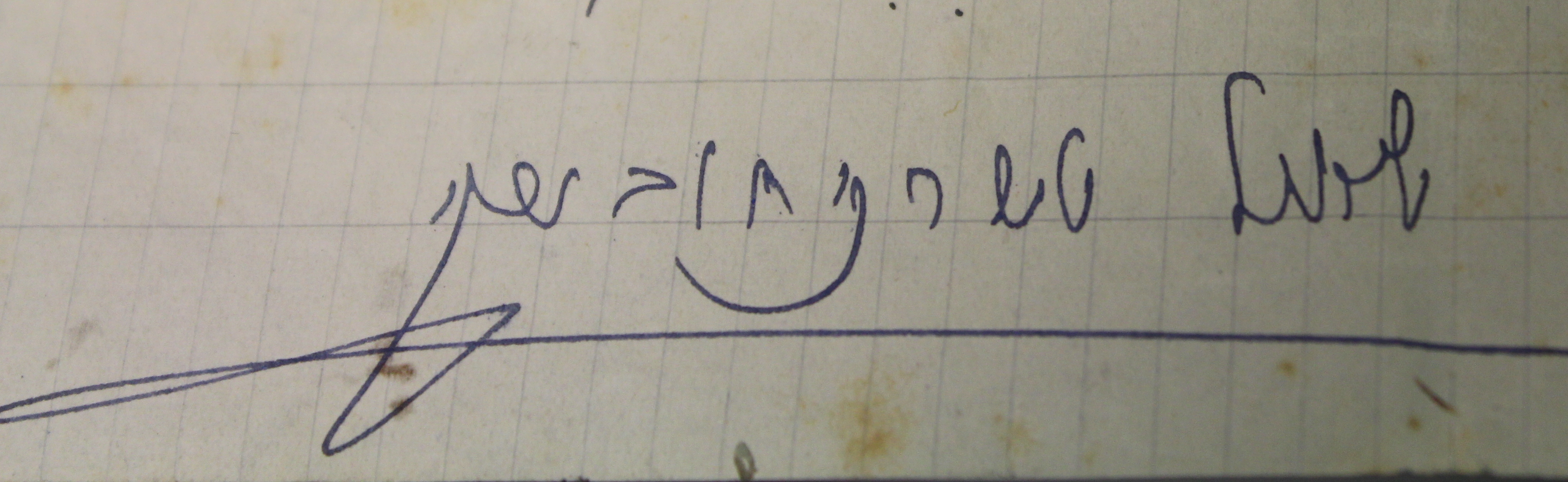

Shaul Tchernichovsky (Hebrew: שאול טשרניחובסקי) or Saul Gutmanovich Chernikhovskiy (Russian: Саул Гутманович Черниховский; 20 August 1875 – 14 October 1943) was a Russian-born Hebrew poet. He is considered one of the great Hebrew poets, identified with nature poetry, and a poet greatly influenced by the culture of ancient Greece.

== Biography ==
Tchernichovsky was born on 20 August 1875 in the village of Mykhailivka, Mykhailivka Raion, Taurida Governorate (now in Zaporizhzhia Oblast, Ukraine). He attended a modern Jewish primary school and transferred to a secular Russian school at the age of 10.

He published his first poems in Odessa where he studied from 1890 to 1892 and became active in Zionist circles. His first published poem was "In My Dream."

From 1929 to 1930 he spent time in America. In 1931, he immigrated to the British Mandate of Palestine and settled there permanently.

He married Melania von Hosius-Horbacewicz, a Christian, and resisted all demands from fellow Jews in Palestine that she convert to Judaism. They had a daughter together, Isolda.

He was a friend of the Klausner family of Jerusalem, including the child who would grow up to become the novelist Amos Oz, to whom he was "Uncle Shaul."

Shaul Tchernichovsky died in Jerusalem on 14 October 1943.

== Medical career ==
From 1899 to 1906 he studied medicine at the University of Heidelberg, finishing his medical studies in Lausanne. From then on, he mingled his activities as a doctor with his activities as a poet. After completing his studies he returned to Ukraine to practice in Kharkiv and in Kiev. In the First World War he served as an army doctor in Minsk and in Saint Petersburg.

Tchernichovsky served as doctor of the Herzliya Hebrew High School in Tel Aviv. In his later years he served as doctor for the Tel Aviv schools.

== Literary career ==
=== Poetry ===
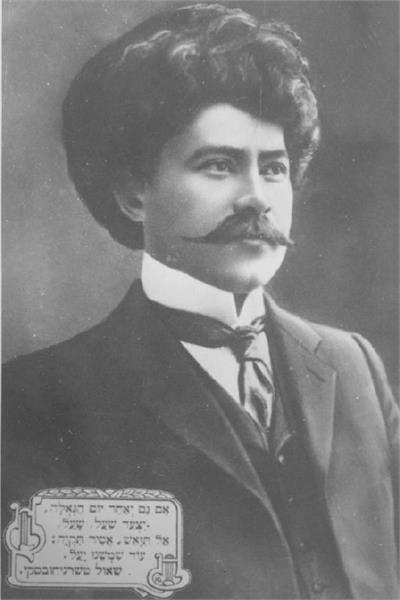
Shaul Tchernichovsky in his youth

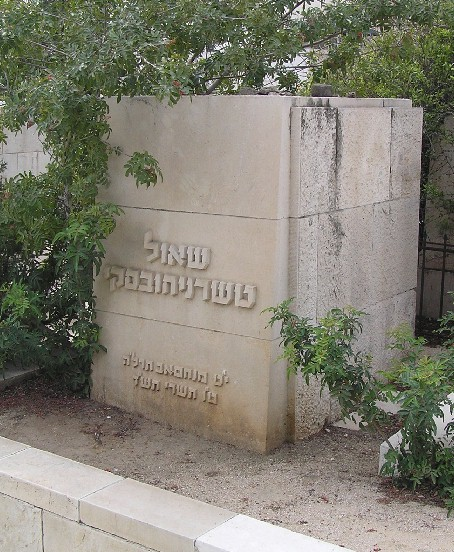
Tchernichovsky's grave in Tel Aviv

In the poetry of Tchernichovsky there is a blend of the influences of Jewish cultural heritage and world cultural heritage. He writes on Hebrew subjects as in "In Endor", a poem about King Saul. Saul comes to the witch of Endor, who dramatically describes Saul's condition at the end of his life. Tchernichovsky particularly identified with the character of Saul, perhaps due to his own name. He further describes in the poem the tragic fall of Saul and his sons on Mount Gilboa. In contrast, in the poem "Before a Statue of Apollo", the poet proves his affinity for Greek culture, identifying with the beauty it represents, even bowing down to it.

Tchernichovsky is the Hebrew poet most identified with the sonnet. He introduced the crown of sonnets (Hebrew: כליל סונטות) into the Hebrew language as a "sonnet" built of fifteen sonnets in which the final sonnet consists of the first lines of the other fourteen sonnets. Each of his crowns of sonnets concerns a particular topic, such as "On Blood" or "To the Sun".

Even with his yen for world culture, Tchernichovsky is identified with the fate of his people. In response to the Holocaust he wrote the poems "The Slain of Tirmonye" and "Ballads of Worms" that brought into expression his heart's murmurings concerning the tragic fate of the Jewish people.

Toward the end of his life he composed some poems that are centered on images from his childhood point of view. These poems, which can properly be termed idylls, are regarded by many as his most splendid poetic works. Some even believe that Tchernichovsky's idylls serve as an example and a model for all of the idylls that have been written in the Hebrew language.

Many of his poems have been set to music by the best Hebrew popular composers, such as Yoel Angel and Nahum Nardi. Singer-songwriters have also set his lyrics to music, as Shlomo Artzi did for They Say There Is a Land (omrim yeshna eretz, אומרים ישנה ארץ), which is also well known in the settings of Joel Engel and of Miki Gavrielov. Oh My Land My Birthplace (hoy artzi moladeti, Hebrew: הו ארצי מולדתי) is better known in the setting by Naomi Shemer, as arranged by Gil Aldema. Shalosh atonot (Three Jenny-asses, Hebrew: שלוש אתונות) also became a popular song.

From 1925 to 1932 he was one of the editors of the newspaper Hatekufa. He also edited the section on medicine in the Hebrew encyclopedia Eshkol.

=== Translation ===
Tchernichovsky was known as a skilled translator. His translation of Homer's Iliad and Odyssey particularly earned recognition. He also translated Sophocles, Horace, Shakespeare, Molière, Pushkin, Goethe, Heine, Byron, Shelley, the Kalevala, the Gilgamesh Cycle, the Icelandic Edda, etc.

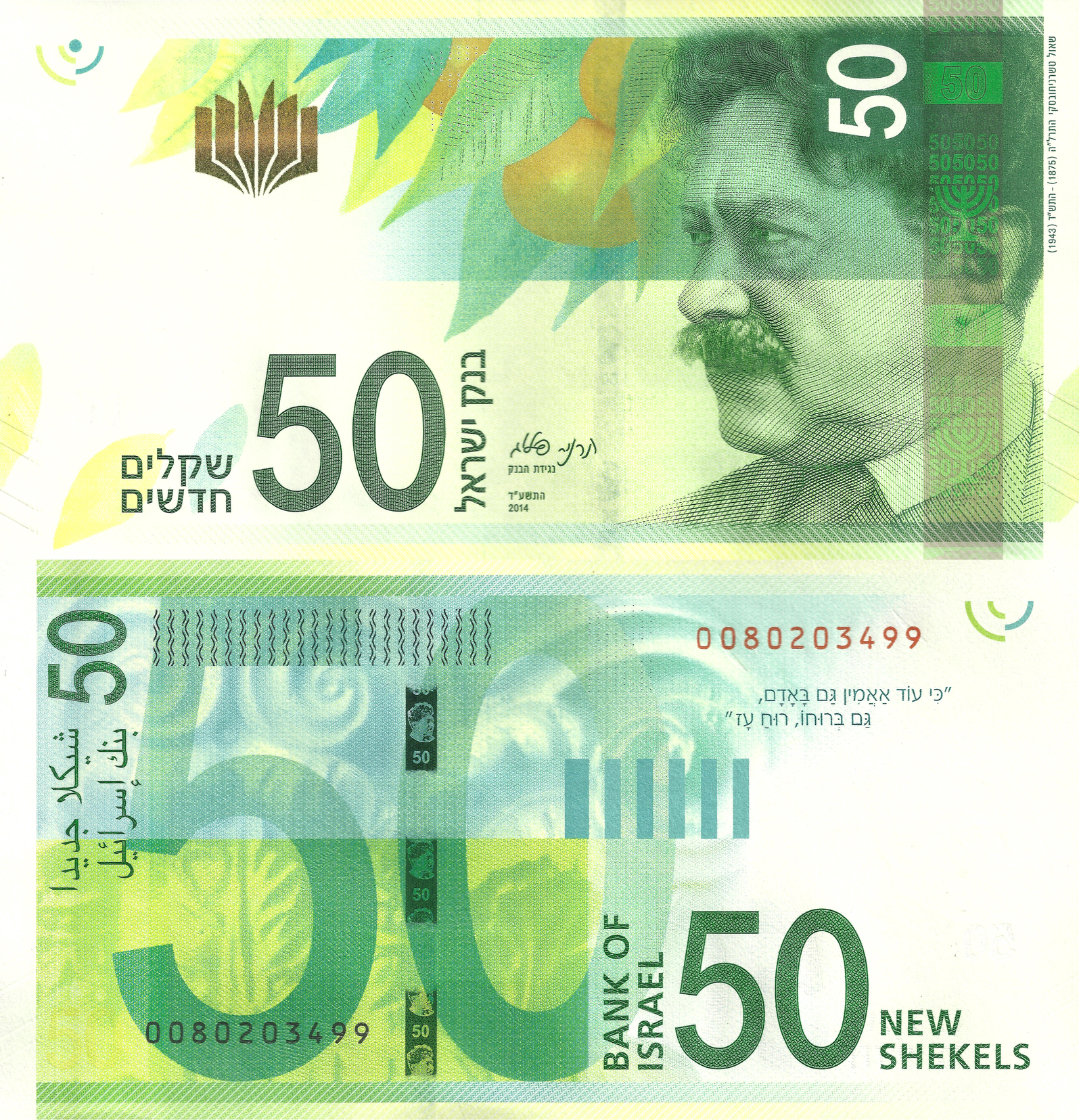
Tchernichovsky on the 50 NIS banknote

=== Editing and linguistics ===
He was active in writers' organizations and a member of the Committee of the Hebrew Language. He was also the editor of the Hebrew terminology manual for medicine and the natural sciences.

== Awards and recognition ==
Tchernichovsky was twice awarded the Bialik Prize for literature, in 1940 (jointly with Zelda Mishkovsky) and in 1942 (jointly with Haim Hazaz).

After his death, the Tel Aviv municipality dedicated a prize for exemplary translation in his name. A school in Tel Aviv is named after him, as is the center for the Hebrew Writers Association in Israel. Many other towns in Israel have also named streets and schools after him.

In 2011, Shaul Tchernichovsky was chosen to be one of four Israeli poets whose portraits would be on Israeli currency (together with Leah Goldberg, Rachel Bluwstein, and Nathan Alterman); the 50 NIS bill was unveiled on 10 September 2014.

There are streets named after him in several Israeli cities, such as Jerusalem, Tel Aviv, Petah Tikva, Ra'anana, and Kfar Saba.

== See also ==
- List of Bialik Prize recipients
- Tchernichovsky Prize
