= Latent image =

Invisible image produced by the exposure of a photosensitive material to light

A latent image is an invisible image produced by the exposure to light of a photosensitive material such as photographic film. When photographic film is developed, the area that was exposed darkens and forms a visible image. In the early days of photography, the nature of the invisible change in the silver halide crystals of the film's emulsion coating was unknown, so the image was said to be "latent" until the film was treated with photographic developer.

In more physical terms, a latent image is a small cluster of metallic silver atoms formed in or on a silver halide crystal due to reduction of interstitial silver ions by photoelectrons (a photolytic silver cluster). If intense exposure continues, such photolytic silver clusters grow to visible sizes. This is called printing out the image. On the other hand, the formation of a visible image by the action of photographic developer is called developing out the image.

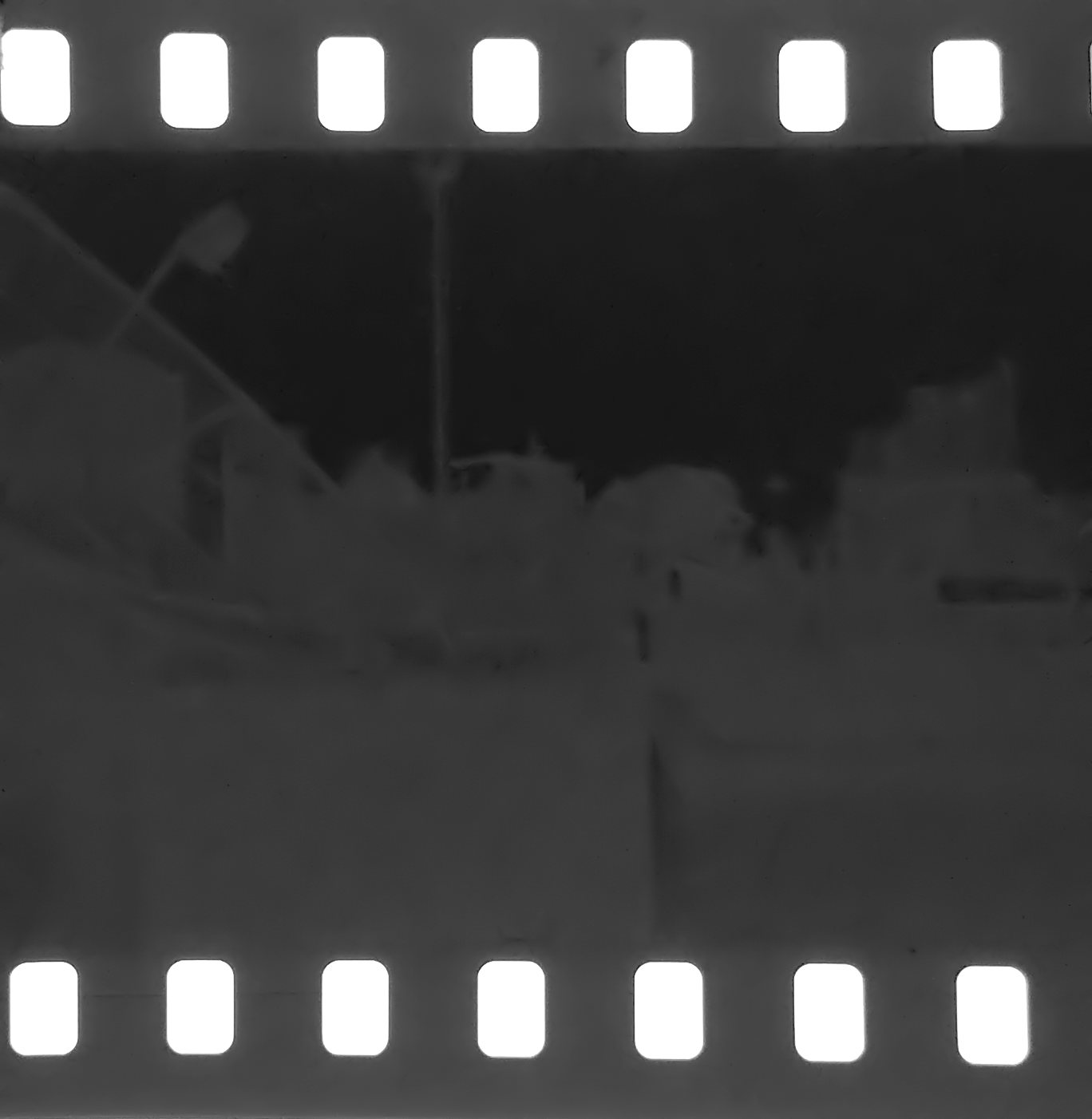
"Printed out" image on a 35mm B&W film, overexposed by approximately 24 stops (about two days of exposure at f/2), without any chemical processing, showing that the silver clusters can grow up to visible sizes without developing.

The size of a silver cluster in the latent image can be as small as a few silver atoms. However, in order to act as an effective latent image center, at least four silver atoms are necessary. On the other hand, a developed silver grain can have billions of silver atoms. Therefore, photographic developer acting on the latent image is a chemical amplifier with a gain factor up to several billion. The development system was the most important technology that increased the photographic sensitivity in the history of photography.

== Mechanism of formation ==
The action of the light on the silver halide grains within the emulsion forms sites of metallic silver in the grains. The basic mechanism by which this happens was first proposed by R. W. Gurney and N. F. Mott in 1938. The incoming photon liberates an electron, called a photoelectron, from a silver halide crystal. Photoelectrons migrate to a shallow electron trap site (a sensitivity site), where the electrons reduce silver ions to form a metallic silver speck. A positive hole must also be generated, but it is largely ignored. Subsequent work has slightly modified this picture, so that "hole" trapping is also considered (Mitchell, 1957). Since then, understanding of the mechanism of sensitivity and latent image formation has been greatly improved.

A latent image is formed when light changes the charge atoms in the molecule. Taking bromine as a halide for this example, when light hits a silver halide molecule, the halide is changed from a negative charge to a neutral one, releasing an electron that then changes the charge of the silver from a positive one to a neutral one.

== Photographic sensitivity ==
One very important way to increase photographic sensitivity is to manipulate the electron traps in each crystal. A pure, defect-free crystal exhibits poor photographic sensitivity, since it lacks a shallow electron trap that facilitates the formation of a latent image. In such a case, many of the photoelectrons will recombine with the silver halide crystal and be wasted. Shallow electron traps are created by sulfur sensitization, introduction of a crystalline defect (edge dislocation), and incorporating a trace amount of non-silver salt as a dopant. The location, kind and number of shallow traps have a huge influence on the efficiency by which the photoelectrons create latent image centers, and consequently, on photographic sensitivity.

Another important way to increase photographic sensitivity is to reduce the threshold size of developable latent images. Gold sensitization of Koslowski creates metallic gold specks on the crystal surface, which by itself does not render the crystal developable. When a latent image is formed around the gold speck, the presence of gold is known to reduce the number of metallic silver atoms necessary to render the crystal developable.

Another important concept in increasing photographic sensitivity is to separate photoholes away from photoelectrons and sensitivity sites. This should reduce the probability of recombination. Reduction sensitization is one possible implementation of this concept. The recent 2-electron sensitization technique is built on this concept. However, the scientific understanding of the behavior of photoholes is more limited than that of photoelectrons.

On the other hand, a deep electron trap or a site that facilitates recombination will compete for photoelectrons and therefore reduces the sensitivity. However, these manipulations are used, for example, to enhance contrast of the emulsion.

== Reciprocity law failure ==
Reciprocity law failure is a phenomenon where the same amount of exposure (irradiance multiplied by duration of exposure) produces different image density when the irradiance (and thus duration) is varied.

There are two kinds of reciprocity failure. They are both related to poor efficiency of utilizing photoelectrons to create latent image centers.

=== High-intensity reciprocity failure (HIRF) ===
High-intensity reciprocity failure (HIRF) is common when the crystal is exposed by intense but brief light, such as flash tube. This reduces photographic speed and contrast. This is common with emulsions optimized for highest sensitivity with long exposure using old emulsion technology.

HIRF is due to creation of many latent subimages that are not developable due to small size. Because of brief and intense exposure, many photoelectrons are created simultaneously. They make many latent subimages (that cannot render the crystal developable), rather than one or a few latent images (that can).

HIRF can be improved by incorporating dopants that create temporary deep electron traps, optimizing the degree of sulfur sensitization, introducing crystalline defects (edge dislocation).

In recent years, many photographic prints are made by scanning laser exposure. Each location on a photographic paper is exposed by a very brief but intense laser. Problems due to HIRF were the major technical challenge in development of such products. Color photographic papers are usually made with very high percentage of silver chloride (about 99%) and the rest is bromide and/or iodide. Chloride emulsions have particularly poor HIRF and usually suffer from LIRF. Paper manufacturers use dopants and precise control of the dislocation sites to improve (to virtually eliminate) HIRF for this new application.

=== Low-intensity reciprocity failure (LIRF) ===
Low-intensity reciprocity failure (LIRF) occurs when the crystal is exposed with weak light of long duration, such as in astronomical photography.

LIRF is due to inefficiency of forming a latent image, and this reduces photographic speed but increases contrast. Due to low level of exposure irradiance (intensity), a single crystal may have to wait for a significant amount of time between absorbing sufficient number of photons. In the process of making a stable latent image center, a smaller and less stable silver speck is made. Further generation of photoelectrons is necessary to grow this speck to a larger, stable, latent image. There is a finite probability that this intermediate unstable speck will decompose before next available photoelectrons can stabilize it. This probability increases with decreasing irradiance level.

LIRF can be improved by optimizing the stability of latent subimage, optimizing sulfur sensitization, and introduction of crystalline defects (edge dislocation).

== Location of latent image ==
Depending on the silver halide crystal, the latent image (LI) may be formed inside or outside of the crystal. Depending on where the LI is formed, the photographic properties and the response to developer vary. Current emulsion technology allows very precise manipulation of this factor in a number of ways.

Each emulsion has a place within each crystal where LIs are formed preferentially. They are called "sensitivity centers." Emulsions that form LIs in the interior are called internal(ly) sensitive emulsions, and those that form LI on the surface are called surface sensitive emulsions. The sensitivity type largely reflects the site of very shallow electron traps that form latent images effectively.

Most, if not all, old technology negative film emulsions had many unintentionally created edge dislocation sites (and other crystalline defects) internally and sulfur sensitization was performed on the surface of the crystal. Because multiple sensitivity centers are present, the emulsion had both internal and surface sensitivity. That is, photoelectrons may migrate to one of many sensitivity centers. In order to exploit the maximum sensitivity of such emulsions, it is generally considered that the developer must have some silver halide solvent action to make the internal latent image sites accessible. Many modern negative emulsions introduce a layer just under the crystal surface where a sufficient number of edge dislocations are intentionally created, while maintaining the bulk of the crystal interior defect-free. Chemical sensitization (e.g., sulfur plus gold sensitization) is applied on the surface. As a result, the photoelectrons are concentrated to a few sensitivity sites on or very near the crystal surface, thereby greatly enhancing the efficiency with which the latent image is produced.

Emulsions with different structures were made for other applications, such as direct positive emulsions. Direct positive emulsion has fog centers built into the core of the emulsion, which is bleached by photoholes generated upon exposure. This type of emulsion produces a positive image upon development in a conventional developer, without reversal processing.

== Development of silver halide crystals ==
A developer solution converts silver halide crystals to metallic silver grains, but it acts only on those having latent image centers. (A solution that converts all silver halide crystals to metallic silver grains is called fogging developer and such a solution is used in the second developer of reversal processing.) This conversion is due to electrochemical reduction, wherein the latent image centers act as a catalyst.

=== Reduction potential of the developer ===
A developer solution must have a reduction potential that is strong enough to develop sufficiently exposed silver halide crystals having a latent image center. At the same time, developer must have reduction potential that is weak enough not to reduce unexposed silver halide crystals.

In a suitably formulated developer, electrons are injected to the silver halide crystals only through silver speck (latent image). Therefore, it is very important for the chemical reduction potential of the developer solution (not the standard reduction potential of the developing agent) to be somewhere higher than the Fermi energy level of small metallic silver clusters (that is, the latent image) but well below the conduction band of unexposed silver halide crystals.

Generally, weakly exposed crystals have smaller silver clusters. Silver clusters of smaller sizes have a higher Fermi level, and therefore more crystals are developed as the developer's reduction potential is increased. However, again, the developer potential must be well below the conduction band of silver halide crystal. Thus there is a limit in increasing the photographic speed of the system by boosting the developer potential; if the solution's reduction potential is set high enough to exploit smaller silver cluster, at some point the solution begins to reduce silver halide crystals regardless of exposure. This is called fog, which is metallic silver made from non-imagewise (exposure-nonspecific) reduction of silver halide crystals. It was also found that, when developer solution is optimally formulated, the maximum photographic speed is rather insensitive to the choice of developing agent (James 1945), and there exists a limit for the size of silver cluster that can be developed.

One way to improve this problem is the use of the gold sensitization technique of Koslowski. A small metallic gold cluster whose Fermi level is high enough to prevent development of the crystal is used to decrease the threshold size of metallic silver cluster that can render the crystal developable.

For further discussion, refer to Tani 1995 and Hamilton 1988.

== Stability of latent image ==
Under normal conditions the latent image, which may be as small as a few atoms of metallic silver on each halide grain, is stable for many months. Subsequent development can then reveal a visible metallic image.

A famous instance of latent-image stability are the pictures taken by Nils Strindberg, the photographer in S. A. Andrée's ill-fated arctic balloon expedition of 1897. The pictures of the expedition and of the balloon stranded on the ice were not discovered and developed until some 33 years later.

== See also ==
- Film base
