= Dome magnifier =

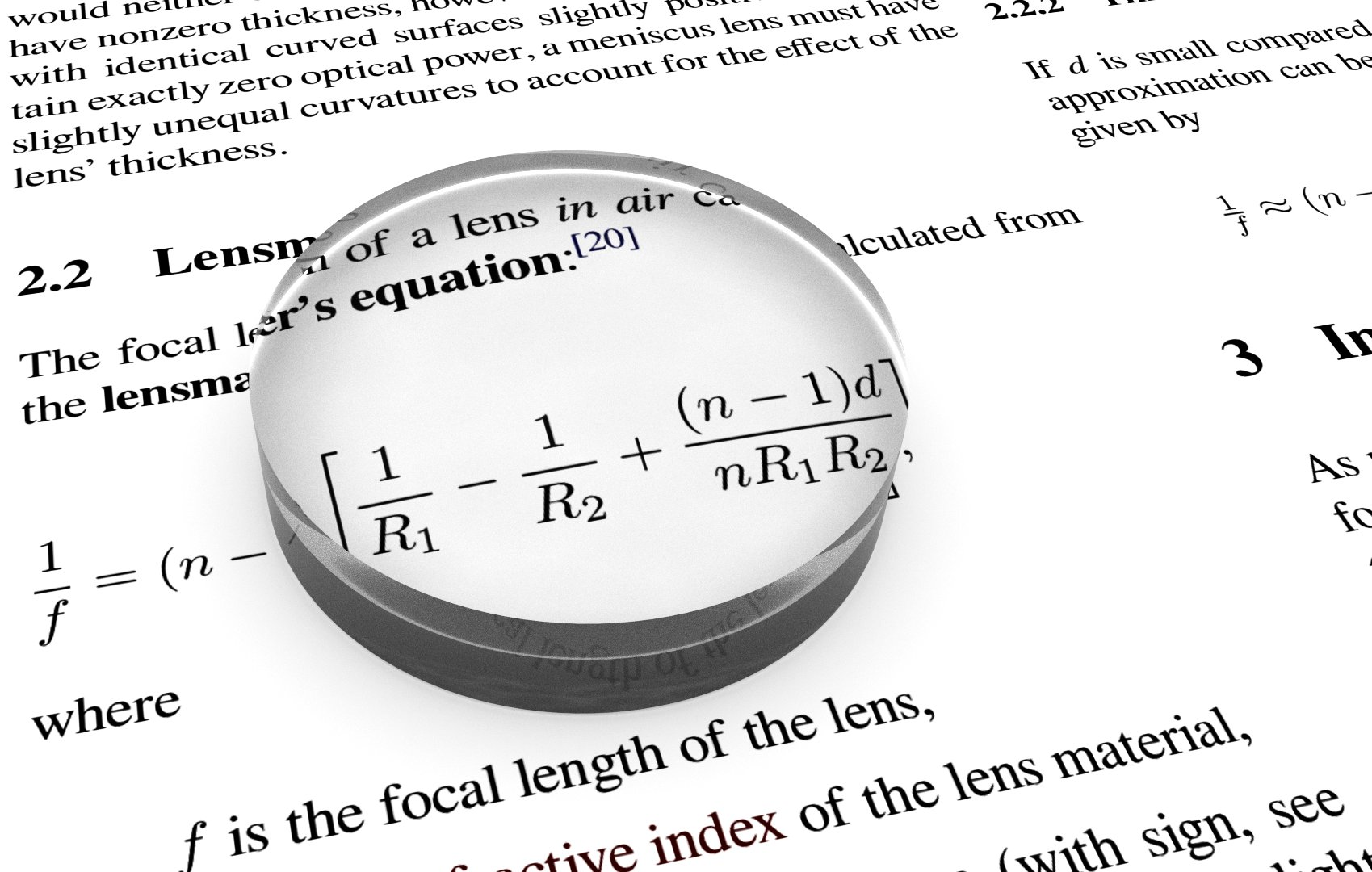
A rendered image showing a dome magnifier over a page of text

A dome magnifier is a dome-shaped magnifying device made of glass or acrylic plastic, used to enlarge words on a page or computer screen. They are plano-convex lenses: the flat (planar) surface is placed on the object to be magnified, and the convex (dome) surface provides the enlargement. They usually provide between 1.8× and 6× magnification. Dome magnifiers are often used by the visually impaired. They are good for reading maps or basic text and their inherent 180° design naturally amplifies illumination from ambient side-light. They are suitable for people with tremors or impaired motor skills, because they are held in contact with the page during use.

== See also ==
- Reading stone
