= Magnifying glass =

Convex lens used to magnify images

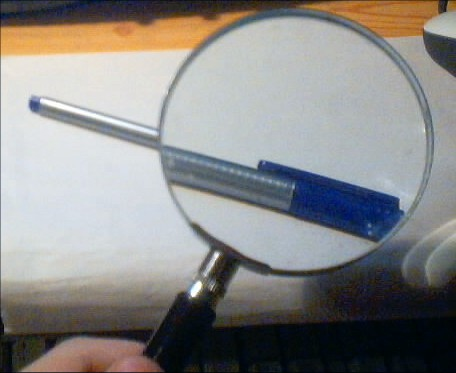
A pen seen through a magnifying glass

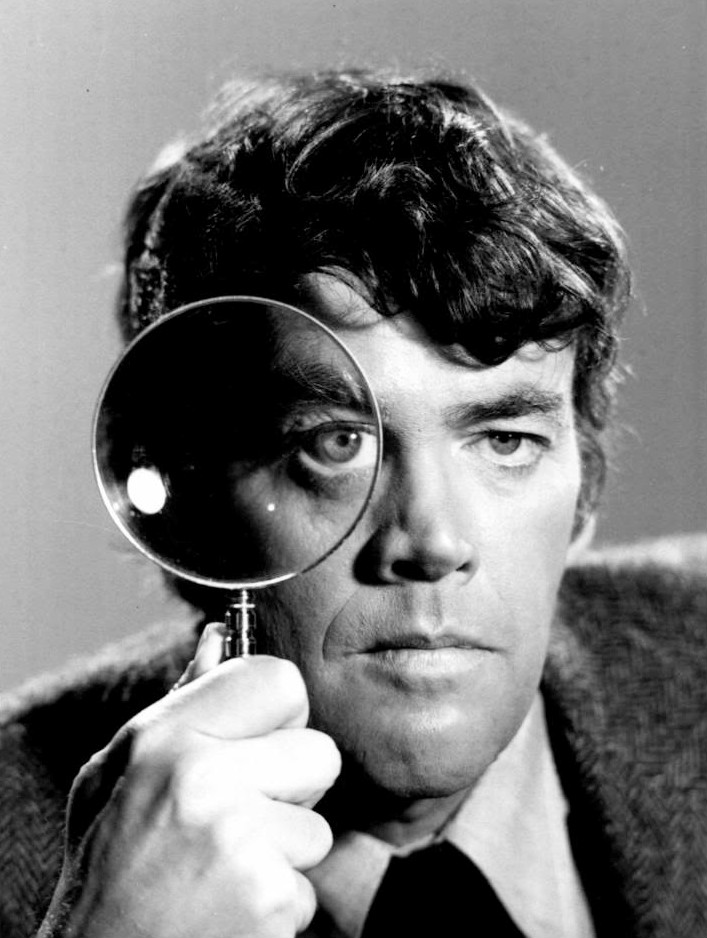
Jim Hutton as detective Ellery Queen, posing with a magnifying glass

A magnifying glass is a convex lens—usually mounted in a frame with a handle—that is used to produce a magnified image of an object. A magnifying glass can also be used to focus light, such as to concentrate the Sun's radiation to create a hot spot at the focus for fire starting.

Evidence of magnifying glasses exists from antiquity. The magnifying glass is an icon of detective fiction, particularly that of Sherlock Holmes.

An alternative to a magnifying glass is a sheet magnifier, which comprises many very narrow concentric ring-shaped lenses, such that the combination acts as a single lens but is much thinner.

== Use ==
The convex lens of a magnifying glass can be used to produce a magnified image of an object. A magnifying glass can also be used to focus light, such as to concentrate the Sun's radiation to create a hot spot at the focus for fire starting.

=== Magnification ===
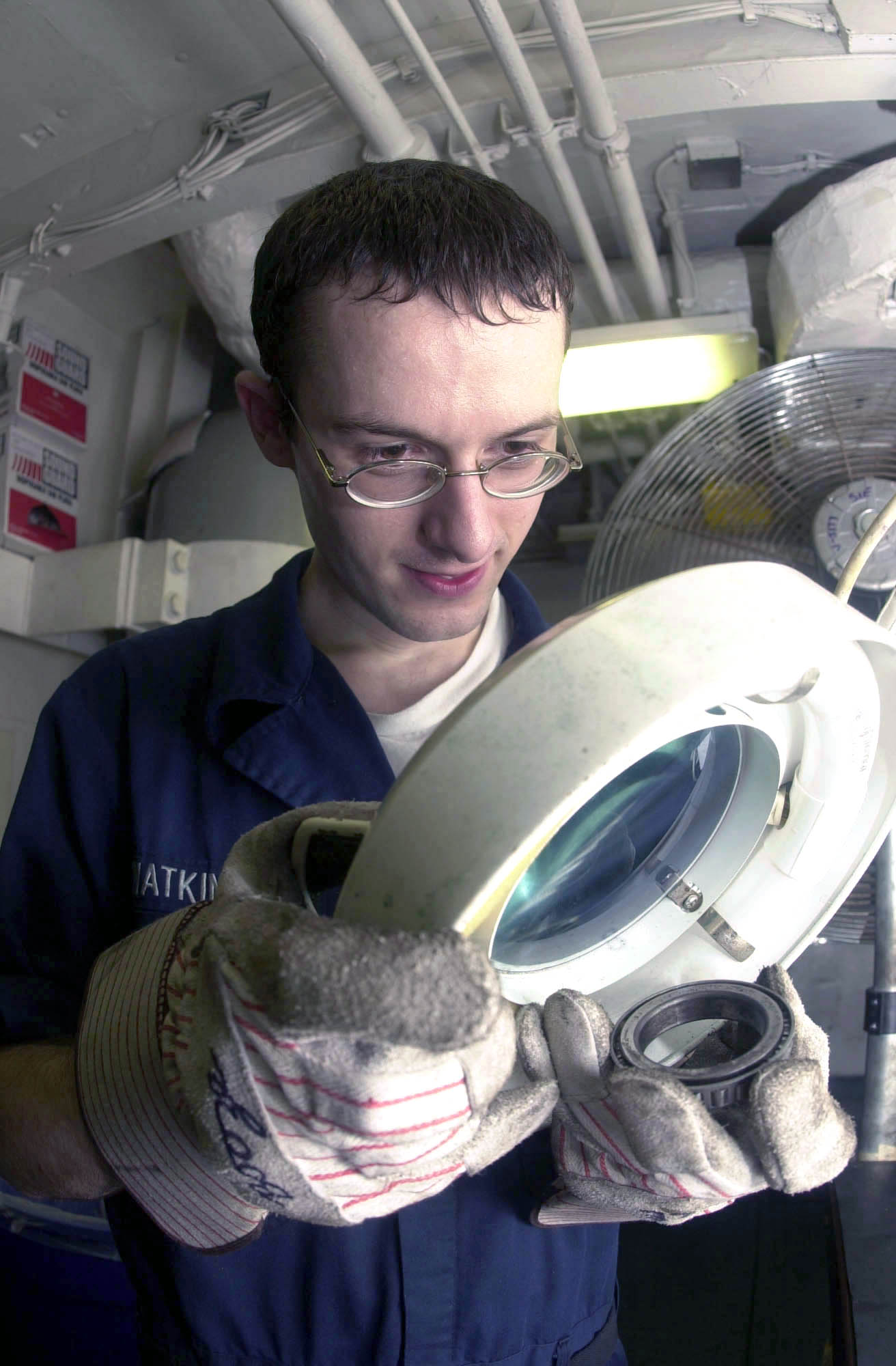
Magnifying glass on an arm lamp

The magnification of a magnifying glass depends upon where it is placed between the user's eye and the object being viewed, and the total distance between them. The magnifying power is equivalent to angular magnification (this should not be confused with optical power, which is a different quantity). The magnifying power is the ratio of the sizes of the images formed on the user's retina with and without the lens. For the "without" case, it is typically assumed that the user would bring the object as close to one eye as possible without it becoming blurry. This point, known as the near point of accommodation, varies with age. In a young child, it can be as close as 5 cm, while, in an elderly person it may be as far as one or two metres. Magnifiers are typically characterized using a "standard" value of 0.25 m.

The highest magnifying power is obtained by putting the lens very close to one eye, and moving the eye and the lens together to obtain the best focus. The object will then typically also be close to the lens.. The magnifying power obtained in this condition is MP_{0} = d_{o}Φ + 1, where Φ is the optical power of the lens in dioptres and d_{o} is the near point of the eye, which is typically assumed to be 0.25 m. This value of the magnifying power is the one normally used to characterize magnifiers. It is typically denoted "m×", where m = MP_{0}. This is sometimes called the total power of the magnifier (not to be confused with optical power).

Magnifiers are not always used as described above because it is more comfortable to put the magnifier close to the object (one focal length away). The eye can then be a larger distance away (so the eye can be relaxed), and a good image can be obtained very easily; the focus is not very sensitive to the eye's exact position. The magnifying power in this case is roughly MP = d_{o}Φ.

A typical magnifying glass might have a focal length of 25 cm, corresponding to an optical power of 4 dioptres. Such a magnifier would be sold as a "2×" magnifier (MP_{0} = d_{o}Φ + 1 = 4 × 0.25 + 1 = 2, where d_{o} = 25 cm is assumed). In actual use, an observer with "typical" eyes would obtain a magnifying power between 1 (MP = d_{o}Φ) and 2 (MP_{0} = d_{o}Φ + 1), depending on where lens is held. The dependence on the value of near point means that an older person obtains more magnification from a magnifying glass than a young person does.

== History ==
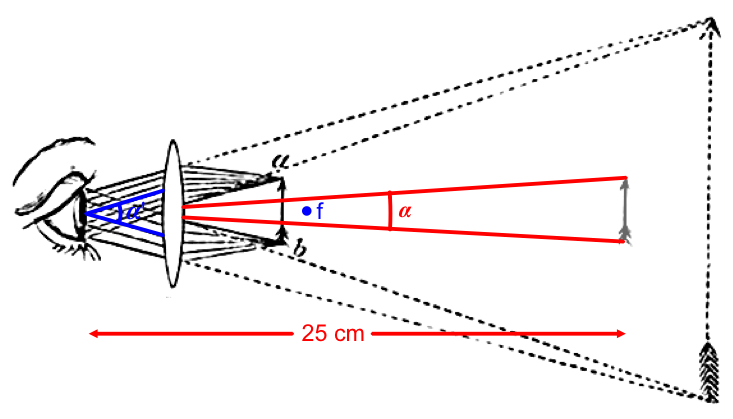
Diagram of a single lens magnifying glass

There is evidence that lenses were widely used throughout the Middle East and around the Mediterranean in classical antiquity. Rock crystal lenses found in a cave in Crete are believed to date to the archaic period and have good enough optical quality to use as magnifying glasses.

The earliest explicit written evidence of a magnifying device is a joke in Aristophanes's The Clouds from 424 BC, where magnifying lenses to ignite tinder were sold in a pharmacy. Another early reference is Pliny the Elder's description of a glass globe filled with water that was used to cauterize wounds. Seneca wrote that it could be used to read letters "no matter how small or dim".

A convex lens used for forming a magnified image was described in the Book of Optics by Ibn al-Haytham in 1021. After the book was translated during the Latin translations of the 12th century, Roger Bacon described the properties of a magnifying glass in 13th-century England. This was followed by the development of eyeglasses in 13th-century Italy.

== Alternatives ==
Magnifying glasses typically have low magnifying power: 2×–6×, with lower magnification providing a wider lens and larger field of view. At higher magnifications, the image quality of a simple magnifying glass becomes poor due to optical aberrations, particularly spherical aberration. When more magnification or a better image is required, other types of hand magnifier are typically used. A Coddington magnifier provides higher magnification with improved image quality. Even better images can be obtained with a multiple-lens magnifier, such as a Hastings triplet.

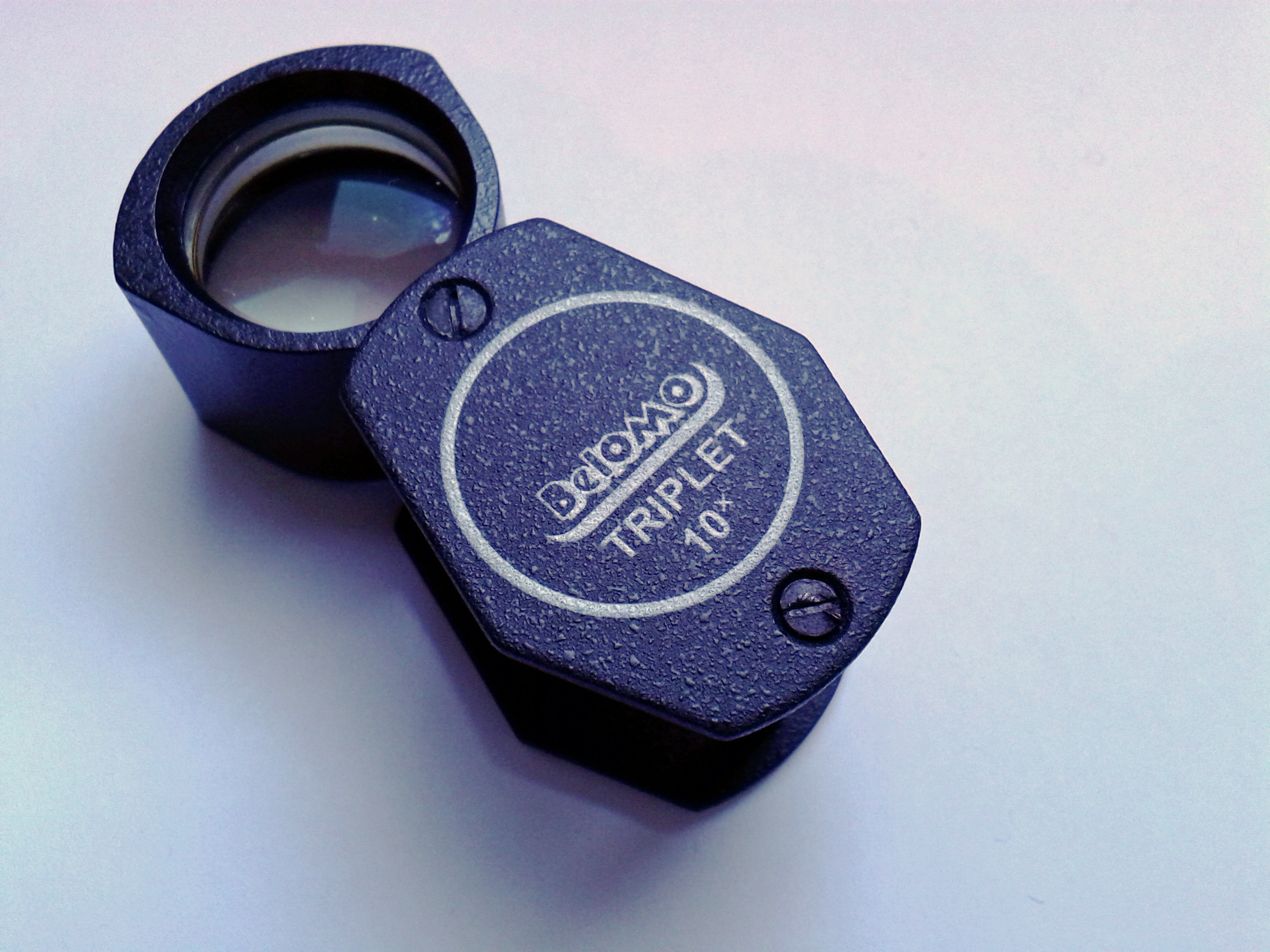
Achromatic triplet loupe

High power magnifiers are sometimes mounted in a cylindrical or conical holder with no handle, often designed to be worn on the head; this is called a loupe. Such magnifiers can reach up to about 25×, although at these magnifications the aperture of the magnifier becomes very small and it must be placed very close to both the object and the eye. For more convenient use or for magnification beyond about 25×, a microscope is necessary.

For the reduction of image distortion and color fringes, a loupe can use multiple lenses, forming a compound lens. These can be designed to correct for both spherical and chromatic aberration effects, with, for example, one lens being biconvex and the other bi-concave. Such are termed apochromatic lens systems. High quality loupes will include three lenses for this purpose, and are termed triplets.

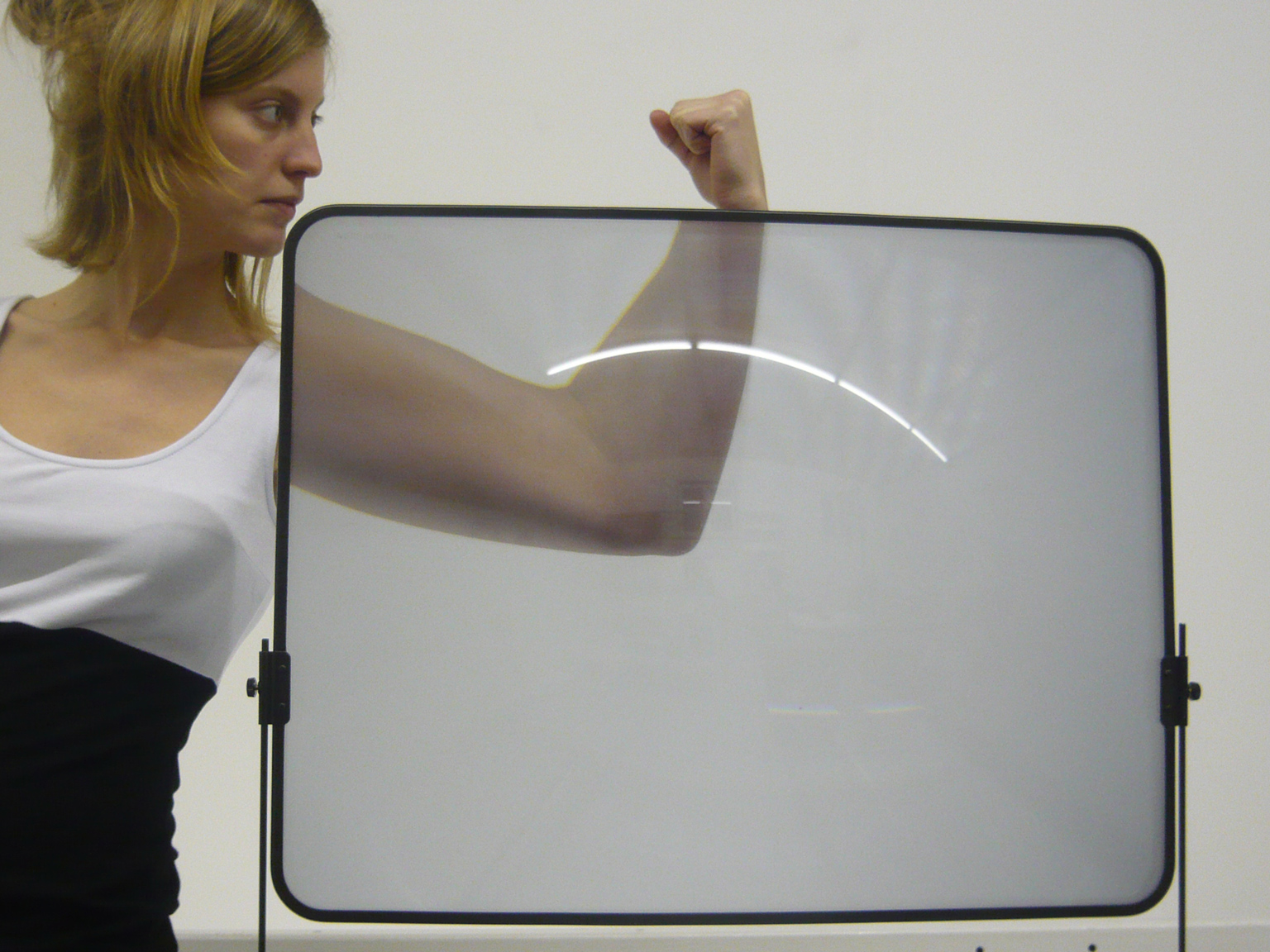
A plastic Fresnel lens sold as a TV-screen magnifier

A sheet magnifier comprises many very narrow, concentric, ring-shaped lenses, such that the combination acts as a single lens but is much thinner. This arrangement is known as a Fresnel lens. Fresnel lenses are used as magnifiers, for example for reading printed text.

== Use as a symbol ==
The magnifying glass (or U+1F50D in Unicode: 🔍) is commonly used as a symbolic representation for the ability to search or zoom, especially in computer software and websites. U+1F50E is a right-pointing version: 🔎.

== See also ==
- Aspheric lens
- Binoculars
- Burning glass – Convex lens for fire making
- Dome magnifier
- Glasses – Form of vision aid
- Graphoscope
- Macro photography – Photography genre and techniques of extreme close-up pictures
- Optical microscope
- Optical telescope
- Reading stone – Optical device
- Screen magnifier – Software that enlarges image on part of a computer screen
- Stanhope lens – Type of microscope
