= Nimrud lens =

8th-century BC piece of rock crystal unearthed in 1850

Coordinates: 36.0992°N 43.3275°E

The Nimrud lens
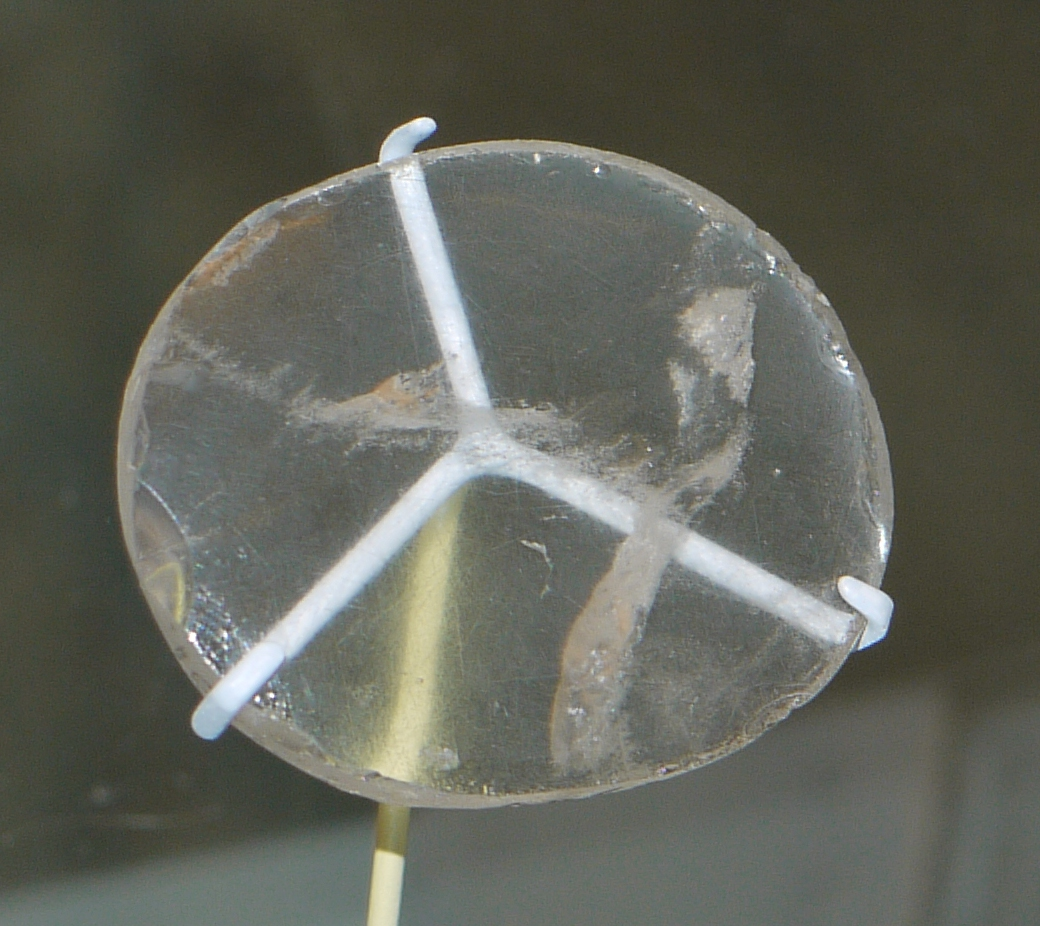
- The lens on display in the British Museum
- Material: Rock crystal
- Size: Diameter: 38 mm (1.5 in); Thickness: 23 mm (0.9 in)
- Created: 750–710 BC
- Period/culture: Neo-Assyrian
- Discovered: 1850; Assyrian palace of Nimrud
- Discovered by: Austen Henry Layard
- Place: North West Palace, Room AB
- Present location: British Museum, London
- Identification: 90959

The Nimrud lens, also called Layard lens, is an 8th-century BC piece of rock crystal which was unearthed in 1850 by Austen Henry Layard at the Assyrian palace of Nimrud in modern-day Iraq. It may have been used as a magnifying glass or as a burning-glass to start fires by concentrating sunlight, or it may have been a piece of decorative inlay.

== Description ==
The lens is slightly oval and was roughly ground, perhaps on a lapidary wheel. It has a focal point about 11 cm (4.5 in) from the flat side and a focal length of about 12 cm (4.7 in). This would make it equivalent to a 3× magnifying glass.

The surface of the lens has twelve cavities that were opened during grinding, which would have contained naphtha or some other fluid trapped in the raw crystal. The lens is said to be able to focus sunlight, although the focus is far from perfect. Because the lens is made from natural rock crystal, the material of the lens has not deteriorated significantly over time.

The Nimrud lens is on display in the British Museum.

== Interpretation ==
The function of the lens is not clear, with some authors suggesting that it was used as an optical lens and others suggesting a purely decorative function.

Assyrian craftsmen made intricate engravings and could have used a magnifying lens in their work. The discoverer of the lens noted that he had found very small inscriptions on Assyrian artifacts that he suspected had been achieved with the aid of a lens.

Italian scientist Giovanni Pettinato of the University of Rome has proposed that the lens was used by the ancient Assyrians as part of a telescope, and that this explains their knowledge of astronomy (see Babylonian astronomy). Experts on Assyrian archaeology are unconvinced, however, doubting that the optical quality of the lens is sufficient to have been of much use. The ancient Assyrians saw the planet Saturn as a god surrounded by a ring of serpents, which Pettinato suggests was their interpretation of Saturn's rings as seen through a telescope. Other experts say that serpents occur frequently in Assyrian mythology and note that there is no mention of a telescope in any of the many surviving Assyrian astronomical writings.

According to his book, Layard found the lens buried beneath other pieces of glass that looked like the enamel of an object, perhaps made of wood or ivory, that had disintegrated. The British Museum curator's notes propose that the lens could have been used "as a piece of inlay, perhaps for furniture" and that there is no evidence that the Assyrians used lenses for their optical qualities (e.g., for magnification, for telescopy, or for starting fire).

== See also ==
- Visby lenses

== Bibliography ==
- A. H. Layard, Discoveries in the Ruins of Nineveh and Babylon (London, 1853), p. 197–98.
