= Extended hemispherical lens =

The extended hemispherical lens is a commonly used lens for millimeter-wave electromagnetic radiation. Such lenses are typically fabricated from dielectric materials such as Teflon or silicon. The geometry consists of a hemisphere of radius R on a cylinder of length L, with the same radius.

== Scanning performance ==
When a feed element is placed a distance d off the central axis, then the main beam will be steered an angle γ off-axis. The relation between d and γ can be determined from geometrical optics:

$$\frac{d}{L} = \tan \gamma.$$

This relation is used when designing focal plane arrays to be used with the extended hemispherical lens.

== See also ==
- Luneburg lens
- Fresnel lens
- Lens antenna
