= Burning glass =

Convex lens for fire making

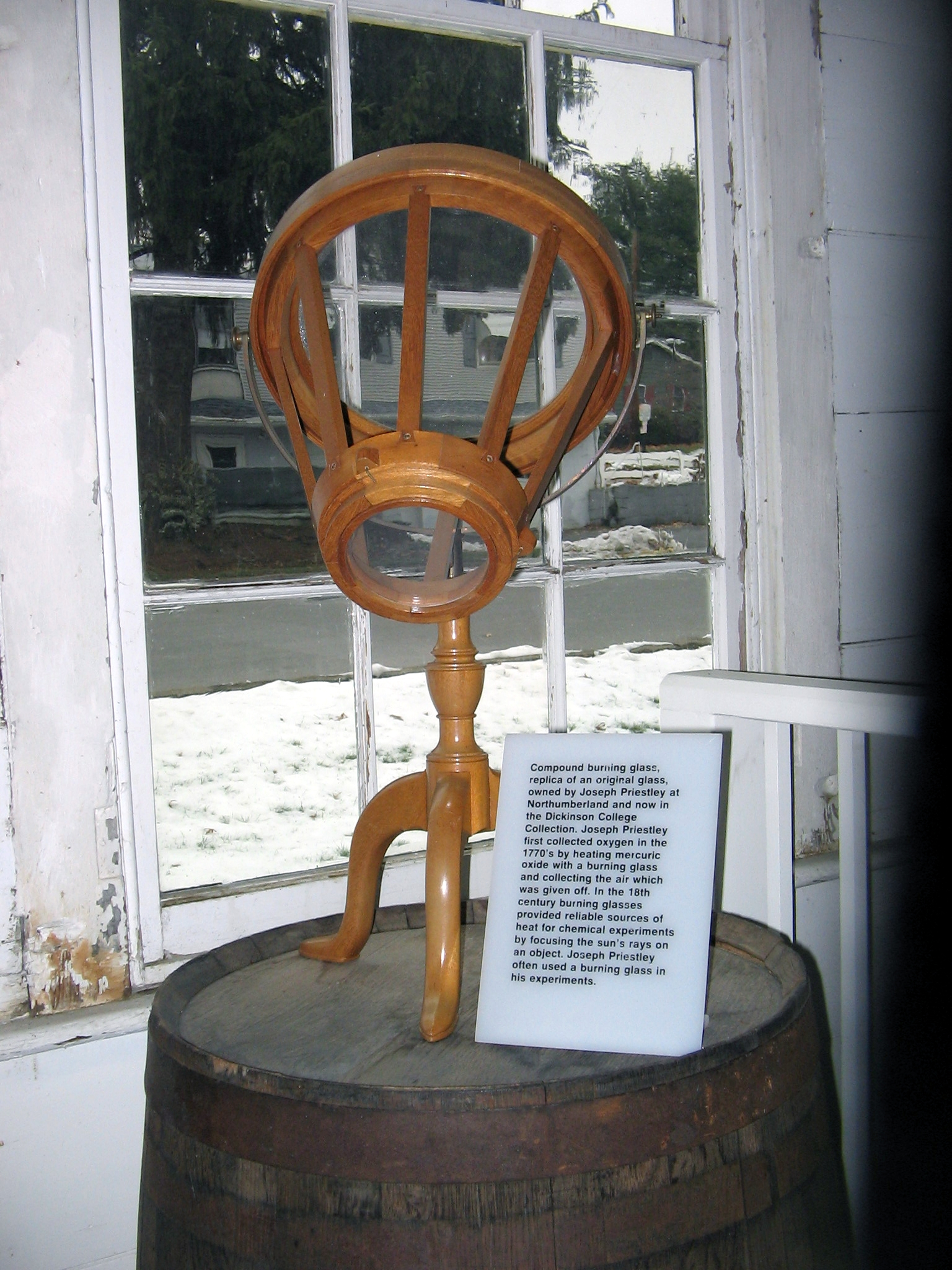
A replica (on a smaller scale) of the burning lens owned by Joseph Priestley, in his laboratory

A burning glass or burning lens is a large convex lens that can concentrate the Sun's rays onto a small area, heating up the area and thus resulting in ignition of the exposed surface. Burning mirrors achieve a similar effect by using reflecting surfaces to focus the light. They were used in 18th-century chemical studies for burning materials in closed glass vessels where the products of combustion could be trapped for analysis. The burning glass was a useful contrivance in the days before electrical ignition was easily achieved.

== History ==
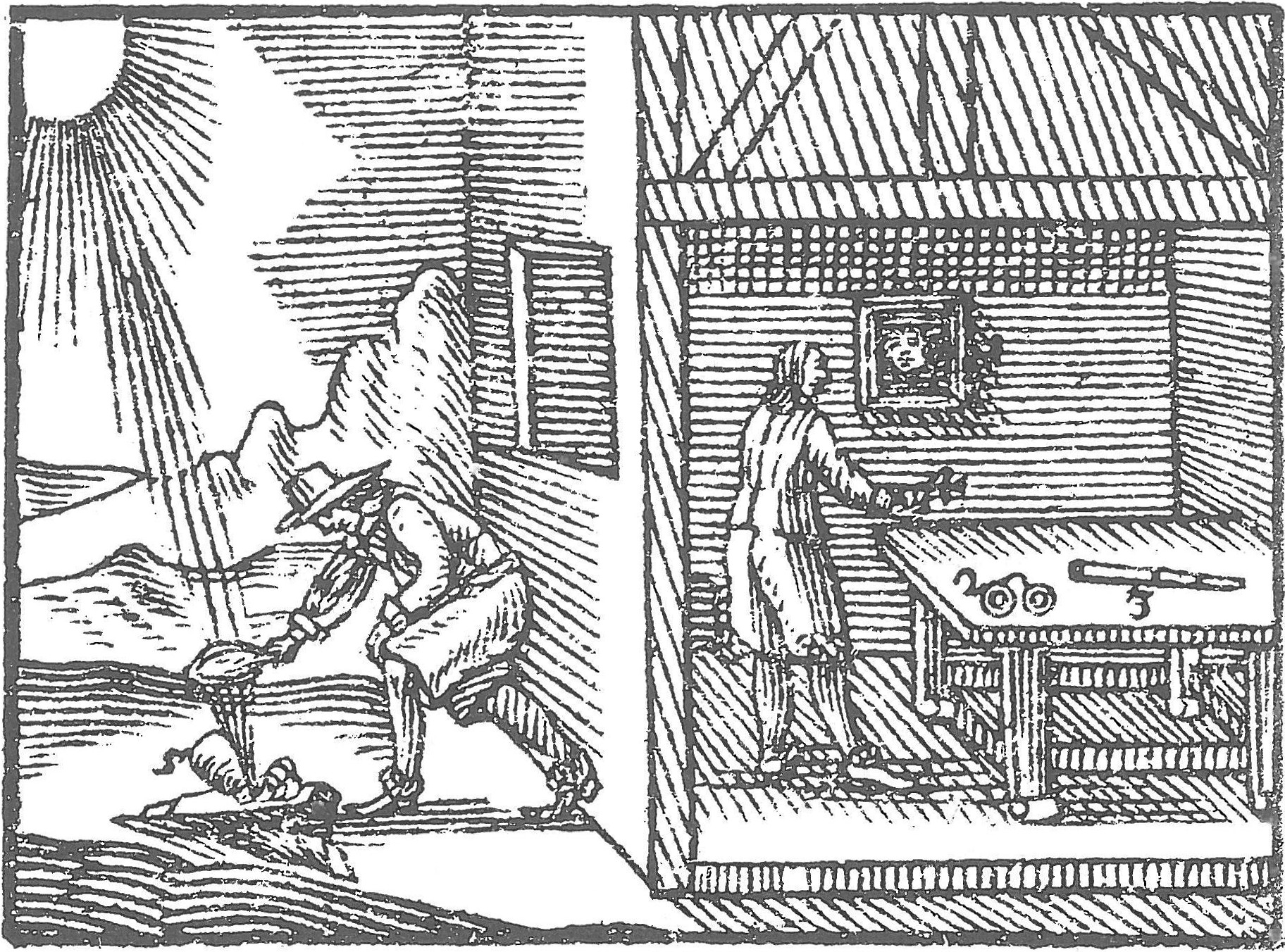
1658 illustration depicting the sun's rays being focused to start a fire

Burning glass technology has been known since antiquity, as described by Greek and Roman writers who recorded the use of lenses to start fires for various purposes. Pliny the Elder noted the use of glass vases filled with water to concentrate sunlight heat intensely enough to ignite clothing, as well as convex lenses that were used to cauterize wounds. Plutarch refers to a burning mirror made of joined triangular metal mirrors installed at the temple of the Vestal Virgins. Aristophanes mentions the burning lens in his play The Clouds (424 BC).

Strepsiades. Have you ever seen a beautiful, transparent stone at the druggists', with which you may kindle fire?

The Hellenistic Greek mathematician Archimedes was said to have used a burning glass as a weapon in 212 BC, when Syracuse was besieged by Marcus Claudius Marcellus of the Roman Republic. The Roman fleet was supposedly incinerated, though eventually the city was taken and Archimedes was slain.

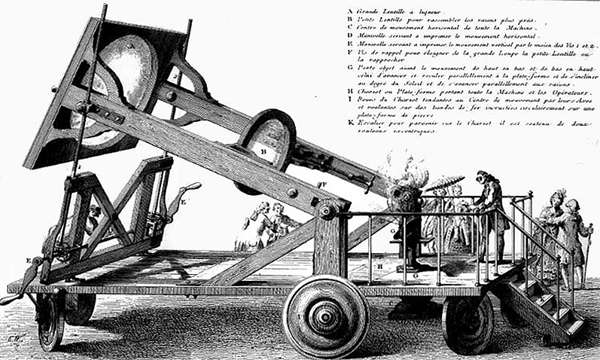
Lavoisier with French Academy of Sciences' lentilles ardentes

The legend of Archimedes gave rise to a considerable amount of research on burning glasses and lenses until the late 17th century. Various researchers from medieval Christendom to the Islamic world worked with burning glasses, including Anthemius of Tralles (6th century AD), Proclus (6th century; who by this means purportedly destroyed the fleet of Vitalian besieging Constantinople), Ibn Sahl in his On Burning Mirrors and Lenses (10th century), Alhazen in his Book of Optics (1021), Roger Bacon (13th century), Giambattista della Porta and his friends (16th century), Athanasius Kircher and Gaspar Schott (17th century), and the Comte de Buffon in 1740 in Paris.

While the effects of camera obscura were mentioned by Greek philosopher Aristotle in the 4th century BC, contemporary Chinese Mohists of China's Warring States Period who compiled the Mozi described their experiments with burning mirrors and the pinhole camera. A few decades after Alhazen described camera obscura in Iraq, the Song dynasty Chinese statesman Shen Kuo was nevertheless the first to clearly describe the relationship of the focal point of a concave mirror, the burning point and the pinhole camera as separate radiation phenomena in his Dream Pool Essays (1088). By the late 15th century Leonardo da Vinci would be the first in Europe to make similar observations about the focal point and pinhole.

Burning lenses were used in the 18th century by both Joseph Priestley and Antoine Lavoisier in their experiments to obtain oxides contained in closed vessels under high temperatures. These included carbon dioxide by burning diamond, and mercuric oxide by heating mercury. This type of experiment contributed to the discovery of "dephlogisticated air" by Priestley, which became better known as oxygen, following Lavoisier's investigations.

Chapter 17 of William Bates' 1920 book Perfect Sight Without Glasses, in which the author argues that observation of the sun is beneficial to those with poor vision, includes a figure of somebody "Focussing the Rays of the Sun Upon the Eye of a Patient by Means of a Burning Glass."

The burning lens of the Grand Duke of Tuscany was used by Sir Humphry Davy and Michael Faraday to burn a diamond in oxygen on 27 March 1814.

== Use ==
=== War: since the legend of Archimedes ===
The first story akin to that of burning glass is by Archimedes, for the purpose of war, in 212 BC. When Syracuse was besieged by Marcus Claudius Marcellus, the Roman fleet was supposedly incinerated by the use of not glass per se, but a concave mirror made of brass focusing sunlight. Whether or not that actually happened, eventually the city was taken and Archimedes was slain.

In 1796, during the French Revolution and three years after the declaration of war between France and Great Britain, physicist Étienne-Gaspard Robert met with the French government and proposed the use of mirrors to burn the invading ships of the British Royal Navy. They decided not to take up his proposal.

=== Domestic use: primitive fire making ===
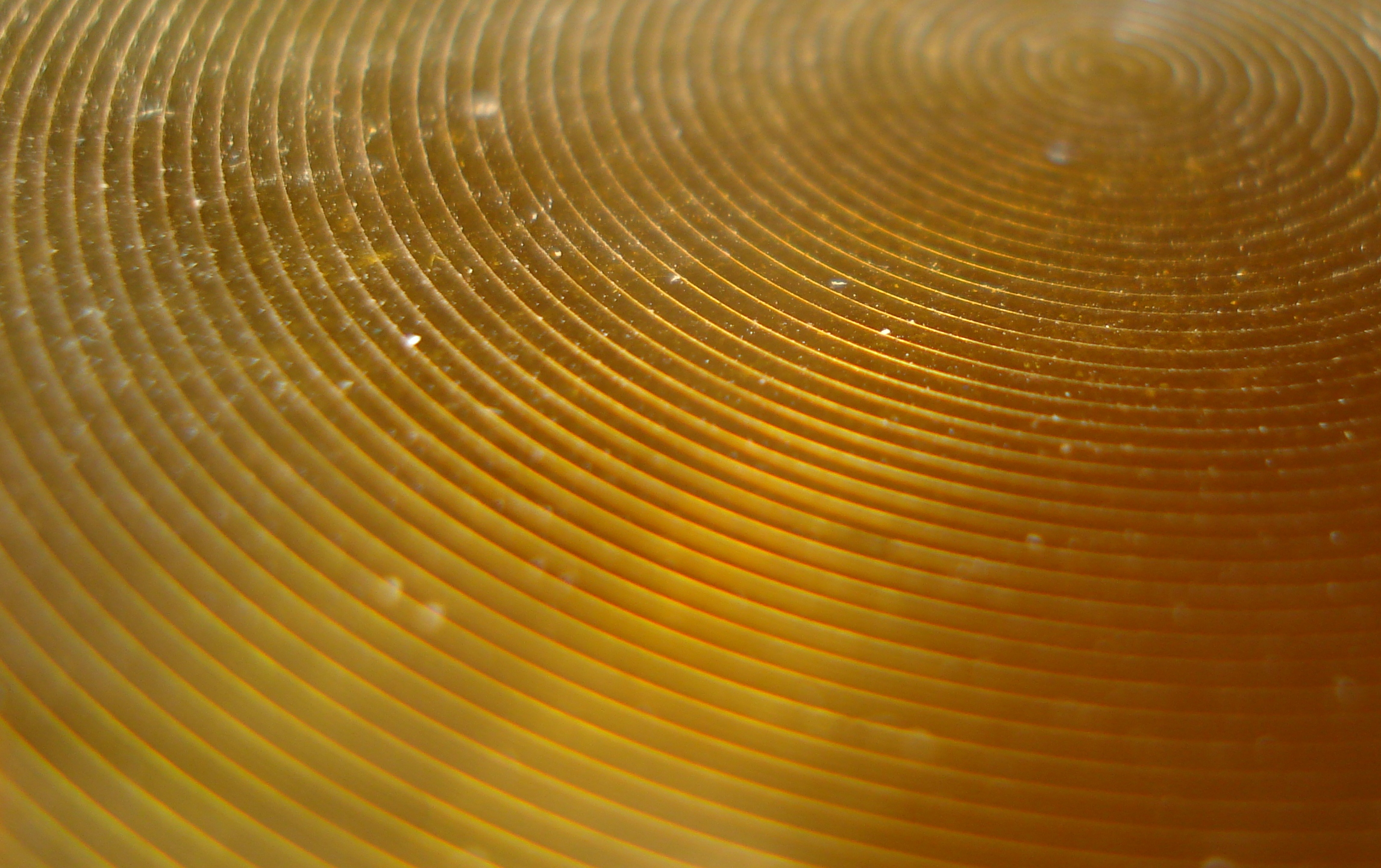
Close-up view of a flat Fresnel lens. This thin, lightweight, non-fragile and low-cost lens can be used as burning-glass in emergency situations.

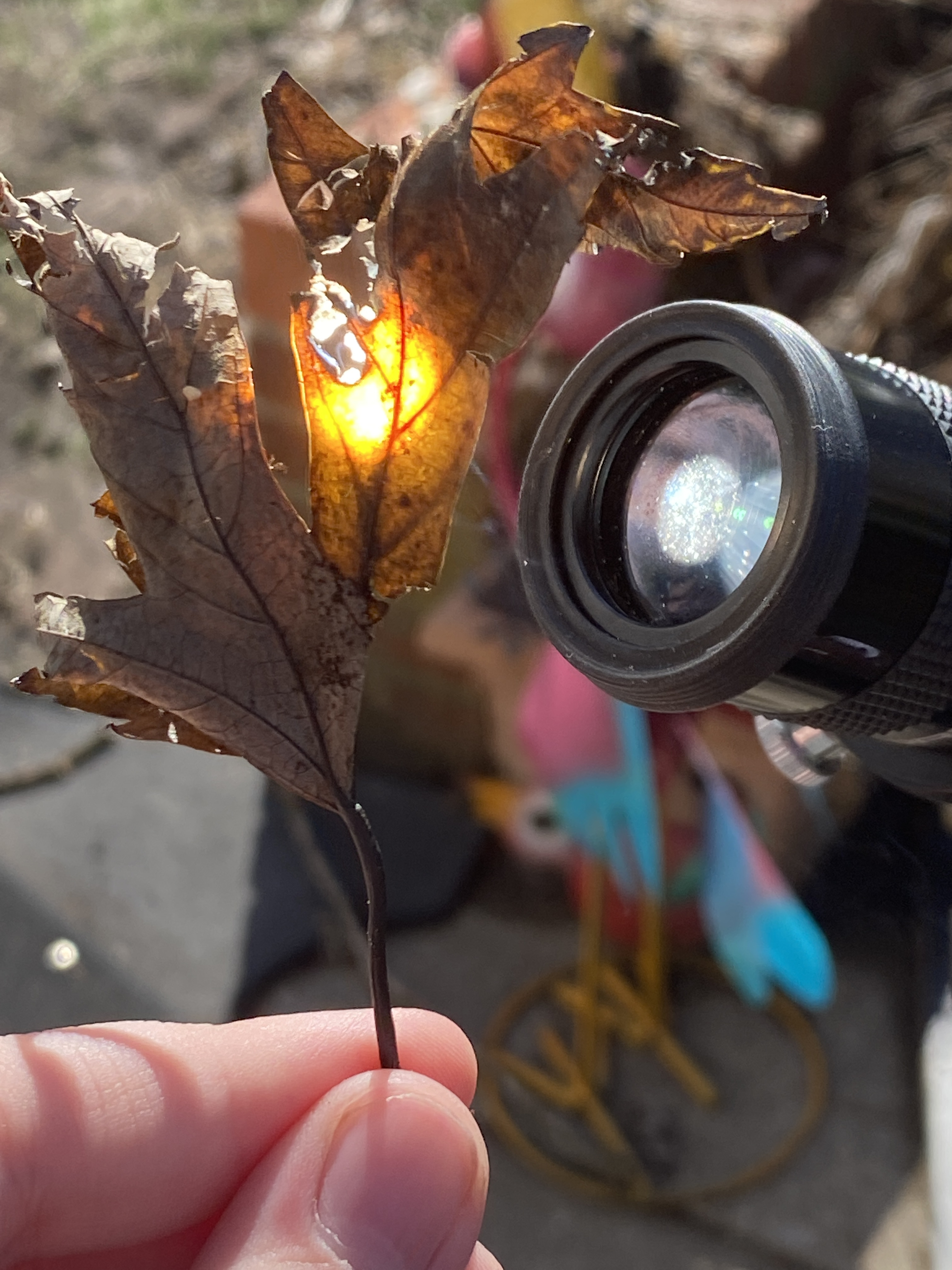
A makeshift burning glass, using the eyepiece of a telescope, being used to burn a leaf.

Burning glasses (often called fire lenses) are still used to light fires in outdoor and primitive settings. Large burning lenses sometimes take the form of Fresnel lenses, similar to lighthouse lenses, including those for use in solar furnaces. Solar furnaces are used in industry to produce extremely high temperatures without the need for fuel or large supplies of electricity. They sometimes employ a large parabolic array of mirrors (some facilities are several stories high) to focus light to a high intensity.

=== Religion: sacred fire ===
In various religions settings, a burning glass is used to set off some sort of sacred fire.

From the 7th to the 16th centuries, a burning glass was used by Christians to set off the Easter Fire during the Easter vigil. Thus, Saint Boniface explained to Pope Zachary that he produced the new fire of Holy Saturday by means of a crystal lens concentrating the rays of the sun. This process was also mentioned in liturgical books until the Roman Pontifical of 1561.

In Cambodia, a burning glass has also been used since ancient times for the cremation of kings and most recently for the funeral of King Sihanouk. The crematorium of the king is traditionally prepared by the Bakus brahmin from the Royal Palace on the last day of the week-long funeral. Small pieces of fragrant agarwood are placed beneath the magnifying glass until it ignites. The incandescent wood is used to light candles and pass on the fire to the attendees, who usually take their lit candles home.

=== Sports: lighting the Olympic torch ===
The Olympic torch that is carried around the host country of the Olympic Games is lit by a burning glass, at the site of ancient Olympia in Greece.

=== Popular culture: verification attempts ===
There have been several real-world tests to evaluate the validity of the legend of Archimedes described above over the centuries, including a test by Comte de Buffon (circa 1747), documented in the paper titled "Invention De Miroirs Ardens, Pour Brusler a Une Grande Distance", and an experiment by John Scott, which was documented in an 1867 paper. In 1973, Greek scientist Dr. Ioannis Sakkas, curious about whether Archimedes could really have used a "burning glass" to destroy the Roman fleet in 212 BC, lined up nearly 60 Greek sailors, each holding an oblong mirror tipped to catch the sun's rays and direct them at a wooden ship 160 feet away. The ship caught fire at once. Sakkas said after the experiment there was no doubt in his mind the great inventor could have used bronze mirrors to scuttle the Romans.

However, accounting for battle conditions makes such a weapon impractical, with modern tests refuting such claims. An experiment was carried out by a group at the Massachusetts Institute of Technology in 2005. It concluded that although the theory was sound for stationary objects, the mirrors would not likely have been able to concentrate sufficient solar energy to set a ship on fire under battle conditions. Similar experiments were conducted on the popular science-based TV show MythBusters in 2004, 2006, and 2010, arriving at similar results.

However, an episode of Richard Hammond's Engineering Connections relating to the Keck Observatory (whose reflector glass is based on the Archimedes' Mirror) did successfully use a much smaller curved mirror to burn a wooden model, although the scaled-down model was not made of the same quality of materials as in the MythBusters effort.

== See also ==
- Diocles (mathematician)
- Nimrud lens
- Pyreliophorus
- Visby lenses
- Solar furnace
