= Reading stone =

Optical device

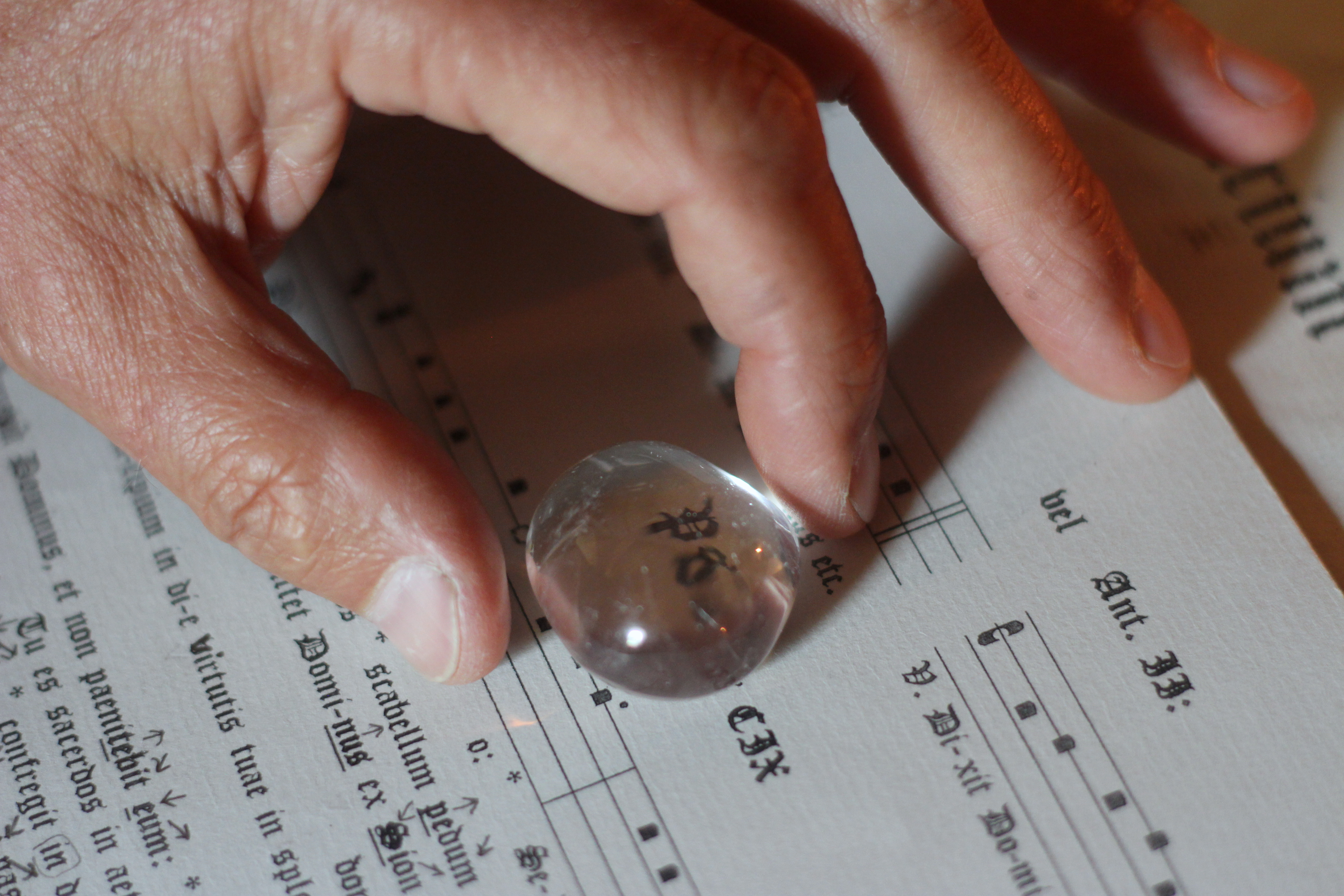
Reading stone in Archeon, a historical theme park

A reading stone is an approximately hemispherical lens that can be placed over text to magnify the letters, making it easier for people with presbyopia to read. Reading stones were among the earliest common uses of lenses.

The invention of reading stones is often credited to Abbas ibn Firnas in the 9th century, although the regular use of reading stones did not begin until around 1000 AD. Early reading stones were made from rock crystal (quartz), beryl and glass, which could be shaped and polished into lenses used for magnification. The Swedish Visby lenses, dating from the 11th or 12th century, may have been early reading stones.

The function of reading stones was replaced by spectacles from the late 13th century onwards, but modern versions are still in use. In their contemporary form, they can be found as rod-shaped magnifiers, flat on one side, that magnify a line of text at a time, or as large dome magnifiers which magnify a circular area of a page. Larger Fresnel lenses can be placed over an entire page. The modern versions are typically made of plastic.

== See also ==
- Dome magnifier
