= Visby lenses =

Medieval Viking artefacts

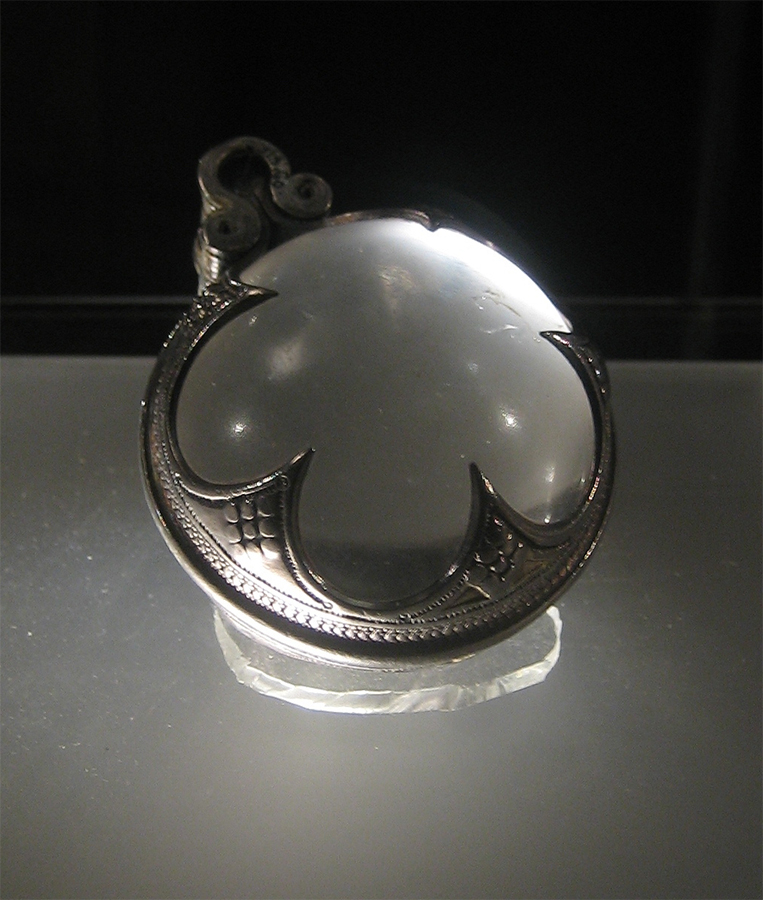
One of the Visby lenses in a silver setting

The Visby lenses are a collection of lens-shaped manufactured objects made of rock crystal (quartz) found in several Viking graves on the island of Gotland, Sweden, and dating from the 11th or 12th century.

Some were in silver mounts with filigree, the mounting covering the back of the lens, and were probably used as jewellery; it has been suggested that the lenses themselves are much older than their mounts.

Some of the lenses can be seen at the Fornsal historical museum in Visby, while some are in the Swedish National Museum in Stockholm, and others have been lost.

== Discovery ==
Excavations at Fröjel on Gotland in 1999 discovered evidence of local manufacture of beads and lenses from rock crystal, with unworked pieces of crystal coexisting with partially finished beads and lenses.

== Characteristics ==
Aspheric lens as measured by Karl-Heinz Wilms

The lenses are bi-aspheric and two of them have very good imaging properties. Their surface appears to be an oblate ellipse, while the surface nearest the eye approaches a parabola.

The best example of the lenses measures 50 mm (2.0 in) in diameter and has a thickness of 30 mm (1.2 in) at its centre, with an angular resolution of 25–30 μm.

It was reported by Otto Ahlström in 1950 that most have aspheric surfaces. The best of the lenses have low spherical aberration, indicating that their surface profile was optimized to improve image quality. Most of the lenses, however, do not show any sign of optimization and produce worse images than a simple spherical lens.

Prior to the Fröjel finds it had been suggested that the lenses were not produced by the Vikings, as there are hints that they were in fact produced in Byzantium or Eastern Europe. The Vikings of Gotland were known to have participated in trade networks that reached as far as Constantinople.

== Proposed uses ==
The Visby lenses provide evidence that sophisticated lens-making techniques were being used by artisans over 1,000 years ago, at a time when researchers had only just begun to explore the laws of refraction. According to Schmidt and his co-workers, it is clear that the artisans worked by trial and error, since the mathematics to calculate the best form for a lens were not discovered until several hundred years later. It has been suggested that the knowledge required to make such lenses was restricted to only a few people, and perhaps only one.

Various uses have been proposed for the lenses. They may have been used by artisans for magnification in fine work, as reading stones, or to start fires. Olaf Schmidt has speculated that they may have been used as part of a telescope.

== See also ==
- Nimrud lens
