= Edwin Dalton (artist) =

English-Australian photographer and painter (active 1818-1865)

- Born: Edward c. 1800–1805; England
- Occupations: Artist and photographer
- Spouse: Magdalena Ross (m. 1841)

Edwin Dalton was a portrait painter and photographer active in England and Australia from 1818 to 1865.

== England ==
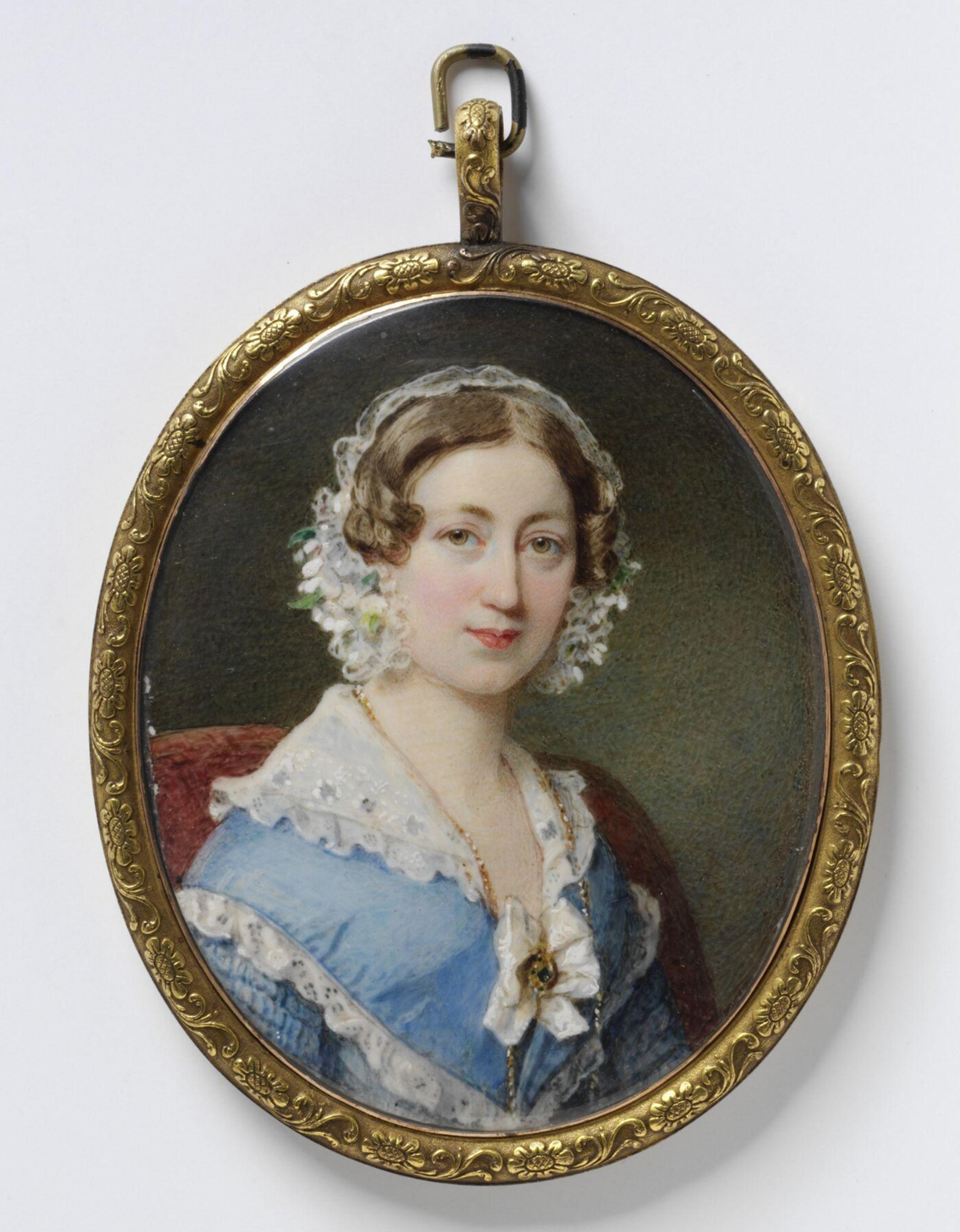
Portrait miniature of Mrs Edwin Dalton, 1826, by William Charles Ross

Edwin (Edward) Dalton was born in England in the early 1800s. He exhibited at the London Royal Academy between 1818 and 1844, and received the Society of Arts' silver palette in 1824. In either 1841 or 1842 he married Magdalena (née Ross). She was the sister of William Ross, one of Queen Victoria's favourite portrait painters, and one of England's last great miniature painters. Initially specialising in portrait painting Dalton and Magdalena enjoyed the patronage of Queen Victoria and Prince Albert in the 1840s. They both worked at Buckingham Palace where they made copies after works in the Royal collection by other artists. In 1846, Dalton also taught lithography to Queen Victoria and Prince Albert.

== Australia ==
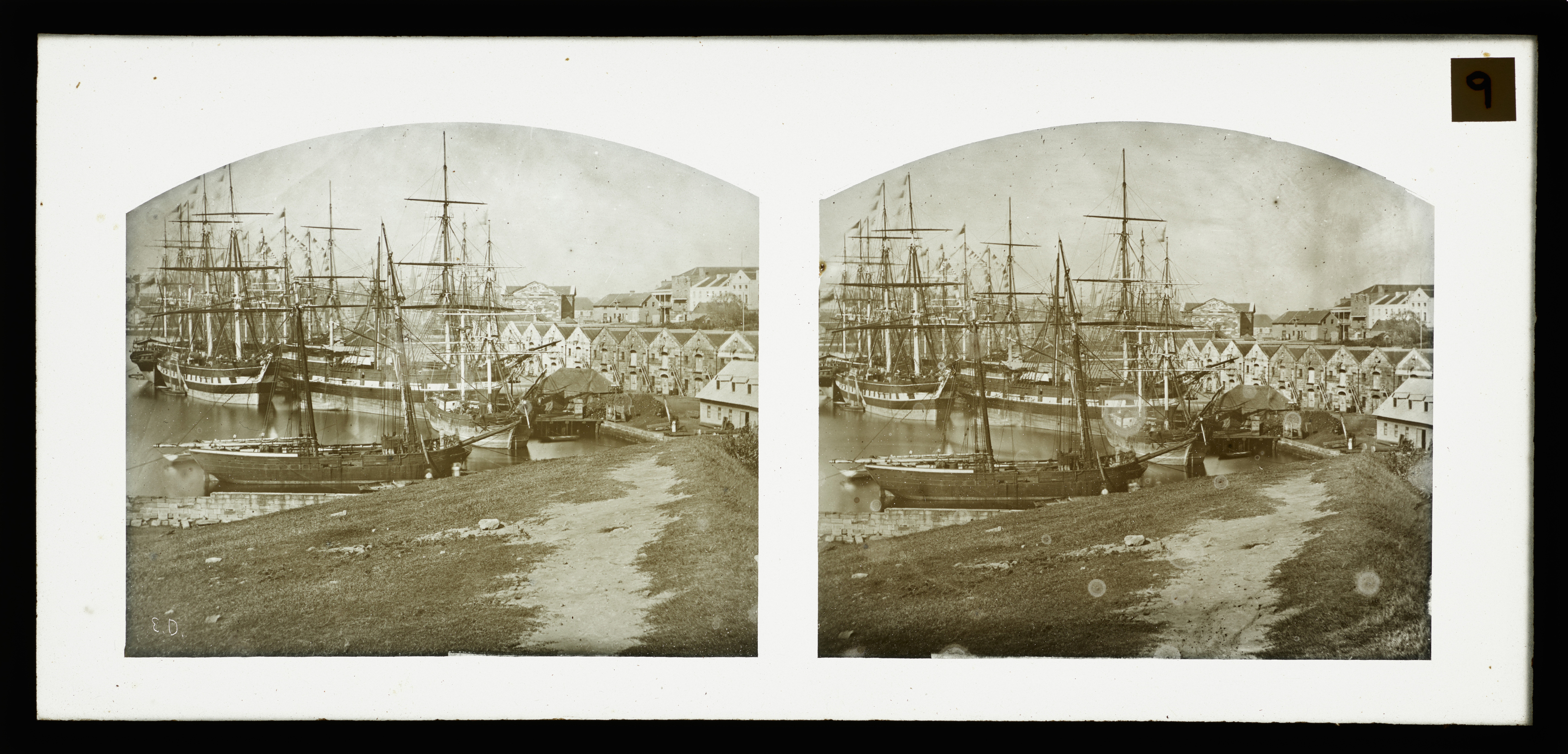
Campbell's Wharf, Sydney, 1859, stereograph by Edwin Dalton

Dalton travelled to Australia sometime before 1853, as by this time he had set up a business as a portrait painter in Victoria. In May of that year he exhibited portraits by himself, and portraits by Queen Victoria at the Melbourne Fine Arts Exhibition.

In January 1855, Dalton arrived in Sydney from Melbourne and set up a temporary studio above Piddingtons Bookshop in George Street. The following month, the Empire newspaper singled Dalton's crayon portraits out for praise, particularly those of Chief Justice Sir Alfred Stephen and Mr. Lamb. In March Dalton travelled to Melbourne to exhibit works assuring his patrons in Sydney he would be returning in a few weeks. A few months later he pledged several works, including drawings by Queen Victoria, to be included in the Fine Art Exhibition held at Mr Baker's Repository, Swanston Street, Melbourne.

By November 1855, Dalton seems to have settled in Sydney. The Sydney Morning Herald enthused about the number of portraitists now working in the Colony and the proliferation of those using the daguerreotype. While citing the merits of photographers Gow, Glaister and Freeman they made special mention of Dalton's crayon portraits. These they felt were the equal of any produced by photography or an artist using oils. They also mention Dalton was taking collodion-type portraits to which he applied his artistic skills.

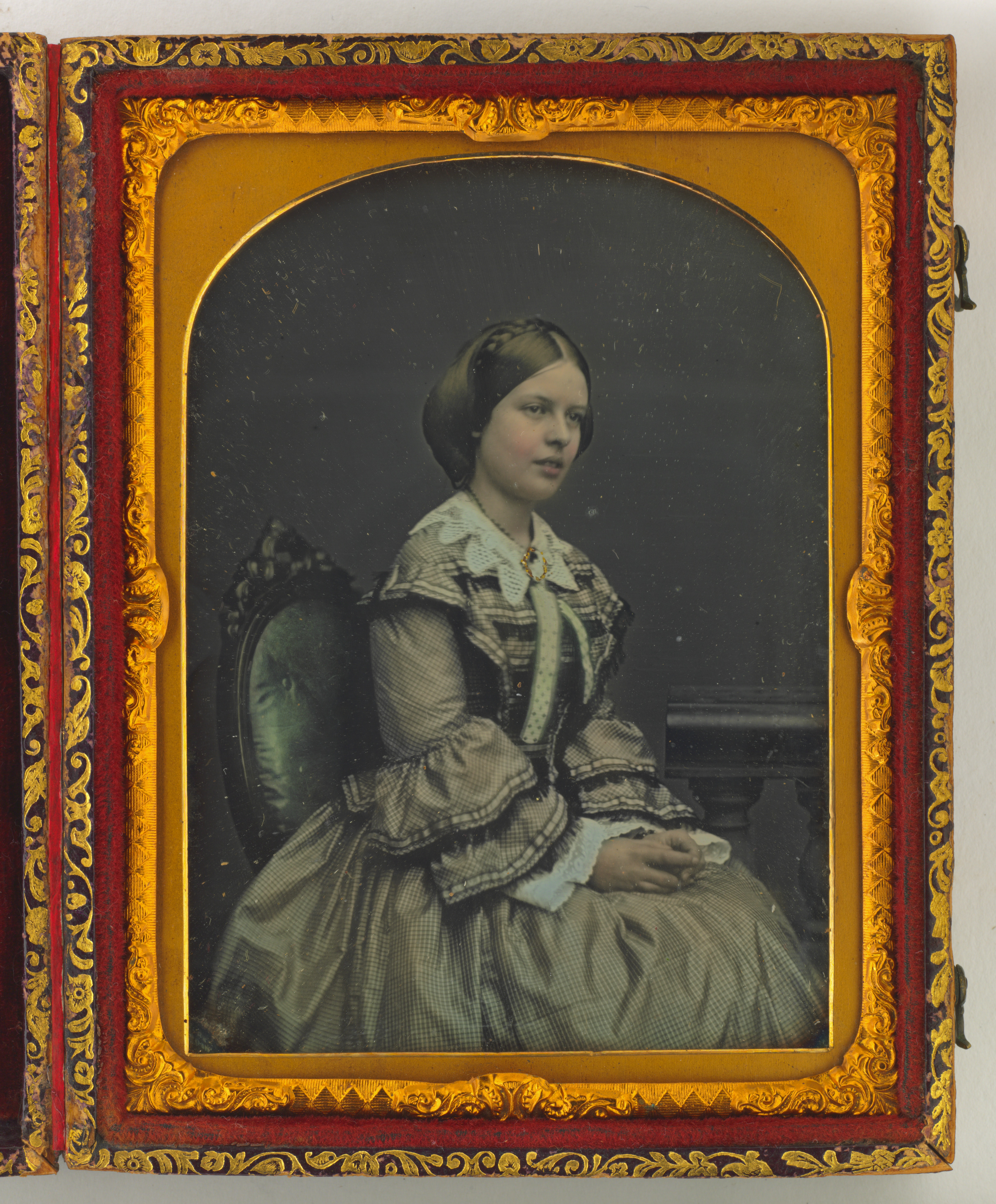
Eleanor Elizabeth Stephen, Sydney, c. 1854, ambrotype by Edwin Dalton

On 22 December 1855, Dalton exhibited his crayon portraits and collodion miniatures at the new Sydney Mechanics' School of Arts, alongside the work of other Sydney photographers. He also exhibited signed pictures, drawn and lithographed by Queen Victoria. These included portraits of the Prince of Wales, Albert, Alice and Alfred, all completed in 1846.

In January the following year Dalton opened the doors to his new photographic studio at 245 George Street, Sydney - just five doors down from King Street. Advertising announcing the event indicates the studio was following the latest trends from London and Paris by specialising in collodion portrait photography. It also invited the public to visit the studio to look at works by Queen Victoria and Prince Albert made while under the tutelage of the Dalton's. The benefits of the new process were also pointed out in a quote from the London Times, The collodion portraits equal the finest mezzotint engravings. They are clear and distinct—free from glare and reflection—and convey a pleasing resemblance of the human features. Scarcely a more valuable present could be given to a friend.

Over the course of 1856, Dalton Studio established itself as a destination for visiting celebrities as well as local dignitaries, including Premiere Stuart Donaldson. Dalton's portrait of English operatic soprano Madame Anna Bishop was singled out by the Sydney newspaper Empire for,

its fidelity of portraiture, depth of tone, and beauty of, colouring, and further stating it ranked, with any work, in its particular line of art, we have yet seen in the colony.

In March 1857 Dalton moved his studio two doors down the road to 243 George Street, above the offices of the auctioneers Chatto and Hughes. This move appears to have enabled Dalton to set up a separate studio devoted to crayon painting, and by May he was advertising sittings devoted to that process. At this time other photographic studios produced similar hand finished photographic portraiture. Primary among these was William Hetzer who in September announced his ability to produce full size photographic portraits of Dr Aaron and Dr Bland, with no slurring of the eyes, and the very near approach to natural colour. The colour was presumably added by Hetzer's wife Hekla.

Throughout 1857 Dalton continued to work in a variety of mediums but specialising in collodion and crayon portraits which were finished in a style similar to ivory miniatures. One of these, a portrait of Killner Walker who died when the ill-fated Dunbar was shipwrecked at South Head, was copied directly from a dim and faded daguerreotype. This painting, and one of Mariann Egan (another of the 121 passengers who died in the wreck) was put on public view in Dalton's studio where they formed part of the many expressions of grief by Sydneysiders shocked by the disaster.

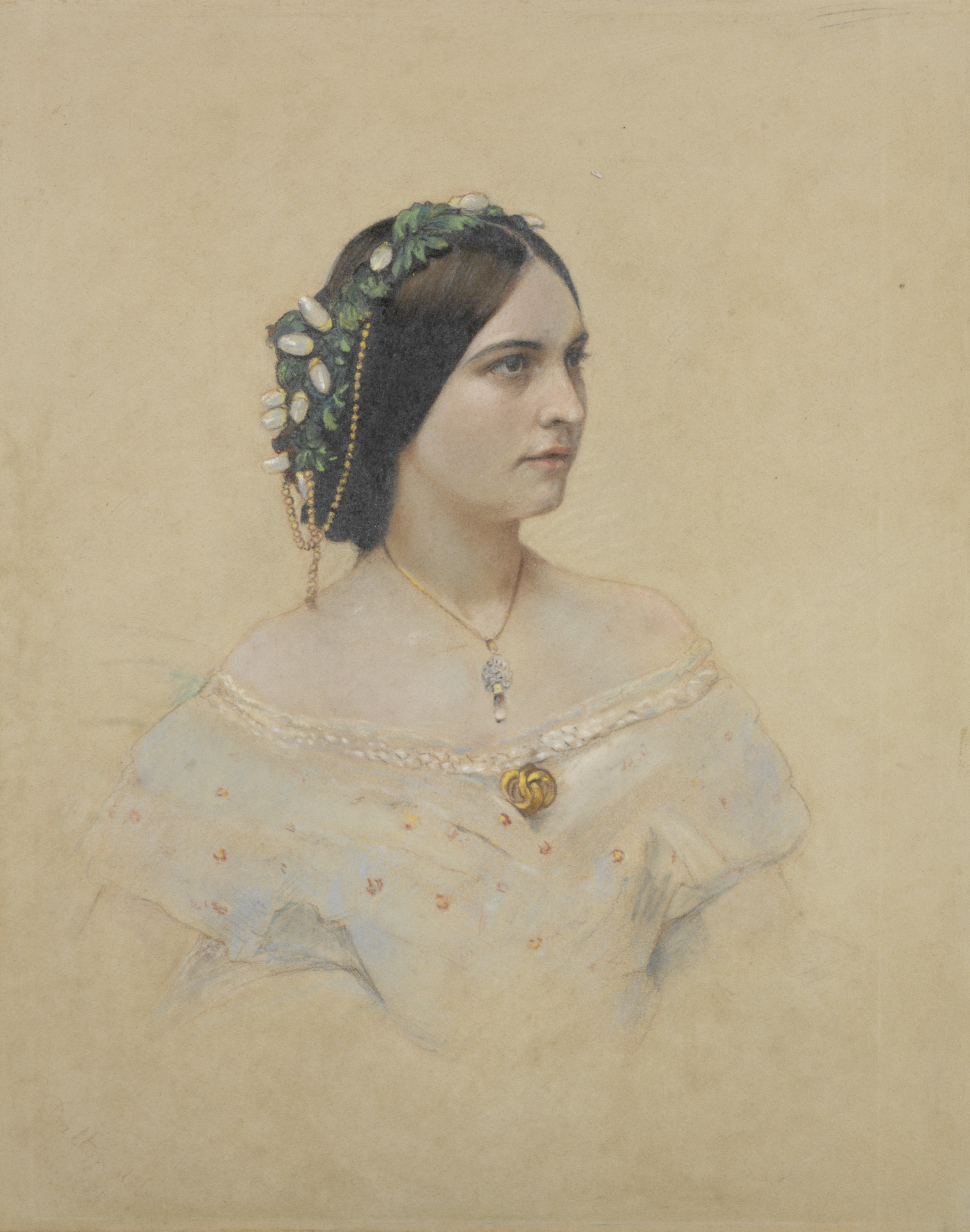
ML 1344 Mrs Frances Jones 1859, photo-crayotype by Edwin Dalton

By the end of 1858 Dalton had opened the Royal Photographic Portrait Establishment at 480 George Street. The name, it seems, reflects his continued promotion of his connections to Queen Victoria. On 8 December Dalton exhibited three examples of his "crayotype" process which combined, "the finish and brilliancy of artistic portraiture with the truthfulness, relief, and power of the photograph", at the conversazione of the Philosophical Society. Dalton claimed that the process (photographs hand finished using crayons) was his own invention, although there were others in Sydney producing work using similar hand-colouring processes.

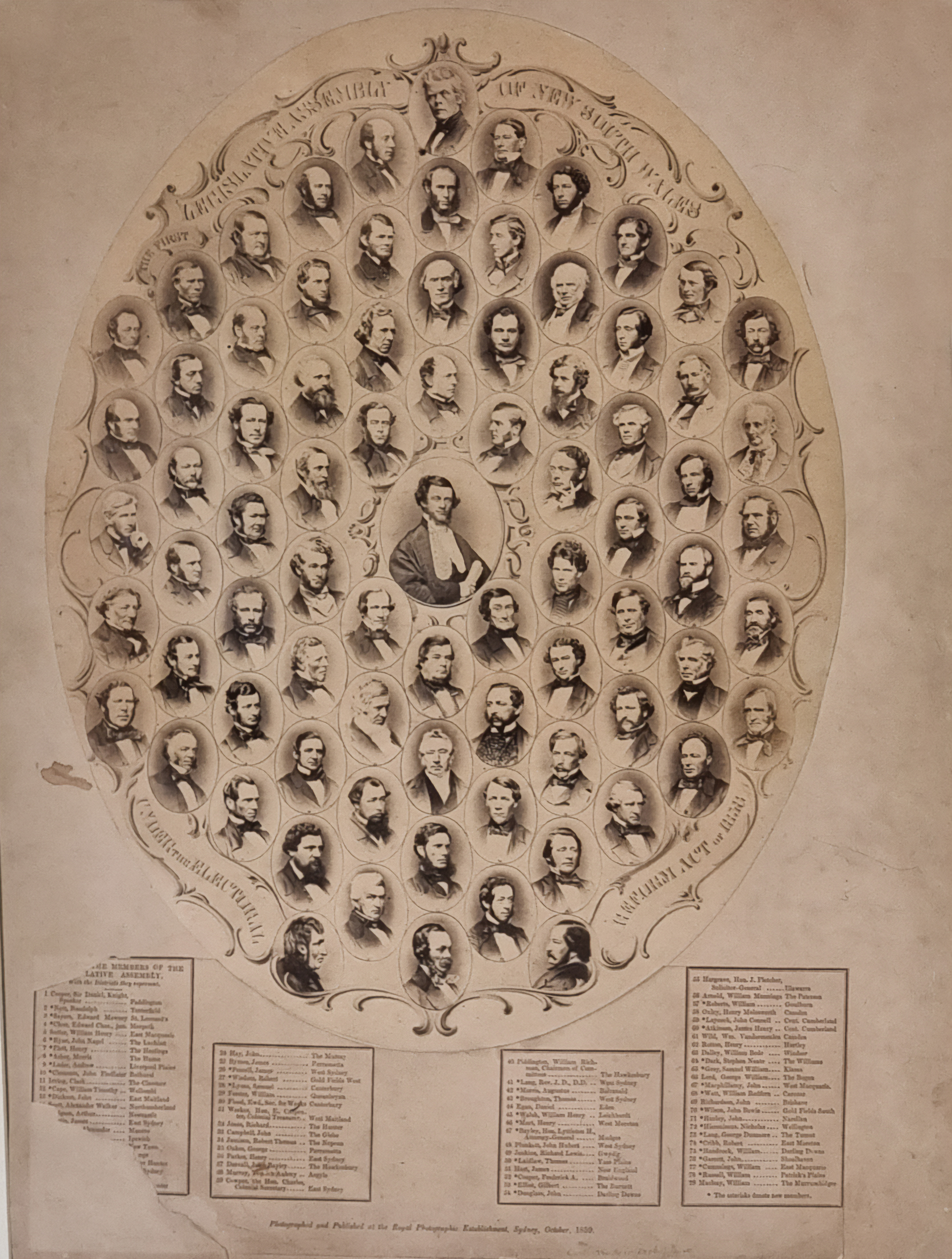
Members of the first Legislative Assembly of New South Wales, 1859, albumen print by Edwin Dalton

In October 1859, the first copies of Dalton's composite photograph of 79 portraits of the members of the Legislative Assembly of New South Wales were made available for sale. Sourcing such a large number of individual portraits required 3–4 months of Dalton's time and the result was touted as being, far beyond anything of its kind previously attempted in the colony. At the centre of the image was Sir Daniel Cooper wearing his official robe while around him were members of his administration, supported by those who occupied prominent positions in the political arena. At 43 x 33 centimeters the final print was thought to be a convenient size for either framing or transmission to distant friends. The photograph, along with his "crayotypes", was displayed in that year's conversazione hosted by the Philosophical Society in the hall of the Australian Subscription Library, in Bent Street, Sydney. It is clear that by the end of 1859 Dalton was using a range of photographic processes including portraits in crayon, oils, watercolours, paper, collodion, as well as microscopic and stereoscopic photography.

On Wednesday 27 August 1862 disaster struck. A fire which started in the George Street premises of Mr. Foster (a confectioner) quickly spread and engulfed the Dalton's photographic studio on the upper stories of the building, completely destroying its contents. Losses included photographic instruments, chemical supplies, several hundred negative plates, crayotype portraits and etchings made by Queen Victoria which the Dalton's had brought with them from England. Just a week after losing his entire stock Dalton opened a new premises at 320 George Street, near Hunter Street, and immediately resumed his photographic work.

== End of Dalton's Photography Studio ==
In December 1863 Dalton again exhibited his work at the conversazione of the Philosophical Society of New South Wales in the Australian Conscription Library. In May 1864, he was displaying life sized crayon portraits of Sir John Young, Reverend John West, Mr. TW Cape, Thomas Cooper and Charles J Fairfax - the last three of which were made directly from old photographs as the sitters were no longer living. Dalton also intimated that he was preparing to leave Australia and there was talk of his employees, Bradley and Allen taking over his business. Later Bradley would claim to have taken all the photographic portraits at Dalton's studio between 1859 and 1865.

By the end of the year Dalton was advertising a reduction in the price of his stock of cartes-de-visites, perhaps an indication of wanting to wind up his business. But in a surprise move Bradley and Allen rather than taking over from Dalton opened their own premises at 360 George Street, in January 1865. Here they advertised crayon portraits, vignetted heads, miniatures on ivory, carte-de-visite and collodiotypes. Mrs Oswald Allen, who had worked as a photographer and artist in Manchester before working for Dalton, did all of the crayon portraits and ivory miniatures. Bradley took the photographs. By March 1867 photographer William Bradley had split from Oswald and Allen and opened his own business at 140 Pitt Street Sydney.

Dalton auctioned his household furniture in February 1865 and sold his studio to Thomas Felton. Six months later the young Scottish artist Montague Scott was the principal artist at Dalton's Royal Photographic Studio where he was commissioned to finish a painting of John Sullivan delivering an address. The painting was 1.29 metres high x 1.57 metres wide. In 1867, Felton won a medal at the Intercolonial Exhibition of Australasia for tinted and untinted photo portraits produced in Dalton's old studio. By August, Montague Scott had also split from Dalton's and was now manager of the Sydney and Melbourne Photographic Company, at 392 George Street, above Mr Sands.

In April 1868, Dalton's premises at 320 George Street were sold to Mr. Freeman (Late of Freeman Brothers and Freeman Brothers and Prout) who moved from his premises in Castlereagh Street. In doing so Freeman also purchased Dalton's photographic equipment and a large stock of negatives which were combined with the carte-de-visite photographs taken by Freeman Brothers up until 10 February 1867 - in total 22,000 negatives. Here Freeman continued to work in collodiotypes, children's portraits, and photographs finished in oils, watercolours and crayons under the name of Freeman's Studio.
