= Cuddington =

Cuddington is the name of several places in the United Kingdom:

- Cuddington, Buckinghamshire, a village and civil parish
- Cuddington, Eddisbury, near Northwich, Cheshire, a village and civil parish
- Cuddington, Malpas, a civil parish near Malpas, Cheshire, containing the village of Cuddington Heath
- Cuddington, a former name of Kiddington, Oxfordshire
- Cuddington, Surrey, a village demolished to make room for Henry VIII's Nonsuch Palace

== See also ==
- Coddington (disambiguation)
