= Coddington =

Coddington may refer to:

== Places ==
- Coddington, Cheshire, United Kingdom
- Coddington, Derbyshire, United Kingdom
- Coddington, Herefordshire, United Kingdom
- Coddington, Nottinghamshire, United Kingdom
- Coddington, Wisconsin, United States
- Coddington School, a historic school in Quincy, Massachusetts

== Surname ==
- Boyd Coddington (1944–2008), American car customizer
- Deborah Coddington (b. 1953), New Zealand journalist and former politician
- Edwin Foster Coddington (1870–1950), American astronomer
- Emily Coddington Williams (1873–1952), American historian of mathematics, translator, novelist, playwright, and biographer
- Grace Coddington (b. 1941), creative director for the U.S. magazine Vogue
- Henry Coddington (1798–1845), English natural philosopher and Church of England clergyman
- John Coddington (1937–2023), former English footballer (soccer player)
- John Insley Coddington (fl. 1940), American genealogist, co-founding member of the American Society of Genealogists
- Jonathan A. Coddington, American biologist and museum scientist, with a particular interest in spiders
- Remy Coddington (born 2004), Bermudian footballer
- William Coddington (1601–1678), first governor of Aquidneck Island (Rhode Island)
- William Coddington Jr. (1651–1689), colonial governor of Rhode Island
- Sir William Coddington, 1st Baronet (1830–1918), English politician

== Other ==
Coddington magnifier: A magnifying glass consisting of a single thick lens with a central deep groove diaphragm at the equator, limiting the rays to those close to the axis and minimizing spherical aberration.
