= René Dagron =

French photographer and inventor

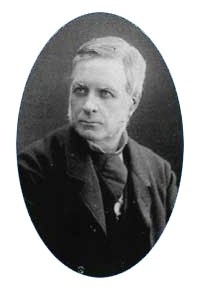
René Dagron

René Prudent Patrice Dagron (17 March 1817 – 13 June 1900) was a French photographer and inventor. He was born in Aillières-Beauvoir, Sarthe, France. On 21 June 1859, Dagron was granted the first microfilm patent in history. Dagron is also considered the inventor of the miniature photographic jewels (French: Bijoux photographiques microscopiques) known as Stanhopes because a modified Stanhope lens is used to view the microscopic picture attached to the lens. He is buried at Ivry Cemetery, Ivry-sur-Seine.

== Early life ==
He grew up in rural France but he left for Paris at an early age. In Paris he distinguished himself in the study of Physics and Chemistry. As a chemistry student Dagron became interested in Daguerrotypes when the process of producing them was announced on 19 August 1839. After graduation, Dagron established a photographic portrait studio in Paris. While in Paris Dagron became familiar with the collodion wet plate and collodio-albumen dry plate processes which he would later adapt to his microfilm techniques.

== Stanhope Viewers ==
In 1857 John Benjamin Dancer's microfilms were exhibited in Paris for the first time and Dagron immediately saw their potential. He used the concept of microphotography to produce simple microfilm viewers which he would later manufacture and incorporate into novelties and souvenir products as well as other applications. Soon after that, Dagron encountered problems with imitators and people infringing on his patents.

On 21 June 1859, Dagron was granted the first microfilm patent in history and in the same year he introduced his photographic miniature Stanhope toys and jewels during the International Exhibition in Paris.

In 1862, Dagron exhibited his miniature Stanhope viewers during the 1862 International Exhibition in London. In the London Fair he received an honourable mention and presented a set of microfilms to Queen Victoria. The same year Dagron published his book: "Cylindres photo-microscopiques montes et non-montes sur bijoux, brevetes en France et a l'etranger". (Translated as: "Photomicroscopic cylinders mounted and non-mounted on jewels: Patents in France and abroad").

In 1864 Dagron published the 36-page booklet Traite de Photographie Microscopique in which he described in great detail the process he invented in producing microfilm positives from normal size negatives. The microfilm industry is considered to have been created by him, starting in 1859 when he obtained his patent.

== Franco-Prussian War ==
During the Siege of Paris (1870–1871) by the Prussian Army, Dagron proposed to the authorities to use his microfilming process to carry the messages by carrier pigeons across German lines.

Rampont, the man in charge of the carrier pigeon program, agreed and a contract was signed on 11 November. According to the contract Dagron was to be paid 15 francs per 1000 characters photographed. A clause in the contract, signed by an official named Picard, gave Dagron the title of "chief of the photomicroscopic correspondence postal service" mentioning in French: "M. Dagron a le titre de chef de service des correspondences postales photomicroscopiques. Il relève directement du Directeur Général des Postes," ( which translates as "Mr. Dagron has the title of the chief of the photomicroscopic correspondence postal service. He reports directly to the Director General of the Post Office").

After a period of difficulties and through hardships brought on by the war and the lack of equipment, Dagron finally achieved a photographic reduction of more than 40 diameters. The microfilms so produced weighed approximately 0.05 grams each and a pigeon was able to carry up to 20 at a time. Up to that point a page of a message could be copied in a microfilm approximately measuring 37 mm by 23 mm but Dagron was able to reduce this to a size of approximately 11 mm by 6 mm which was a significant reduction in the area of the microphotograph.

Dagron photographed pages of newspapers in their entirety which he then converted into miniature photographs. He subsequently removed the collodion film from the glass base and rolled it tightly into a cylindrical shape which he then inserted into miniature tubes that were transported fastened to the tail feathers of the pigeons. Upon receipt the microphotograph was reattached to a glass frame and was then projected by magic lantern on the wall. The message contained in the microfilm could then be transcribed or copied.

By 28 January 1871, when Paris and the Government of National Defense surrendered, Dagron had delivered 115,000 messages to Paris by carrier pigeon.
