= William Charles Ross =

English painter (1794–1860)

Sir William Charles Ross RA (3 June 1794 – 20 January 1860) was an English portrait and portrait miniature painter of Scottish descent; early in his career, he was known for historical paintings. He became a member of the Royal Academy in 1842.

== Life and work ==
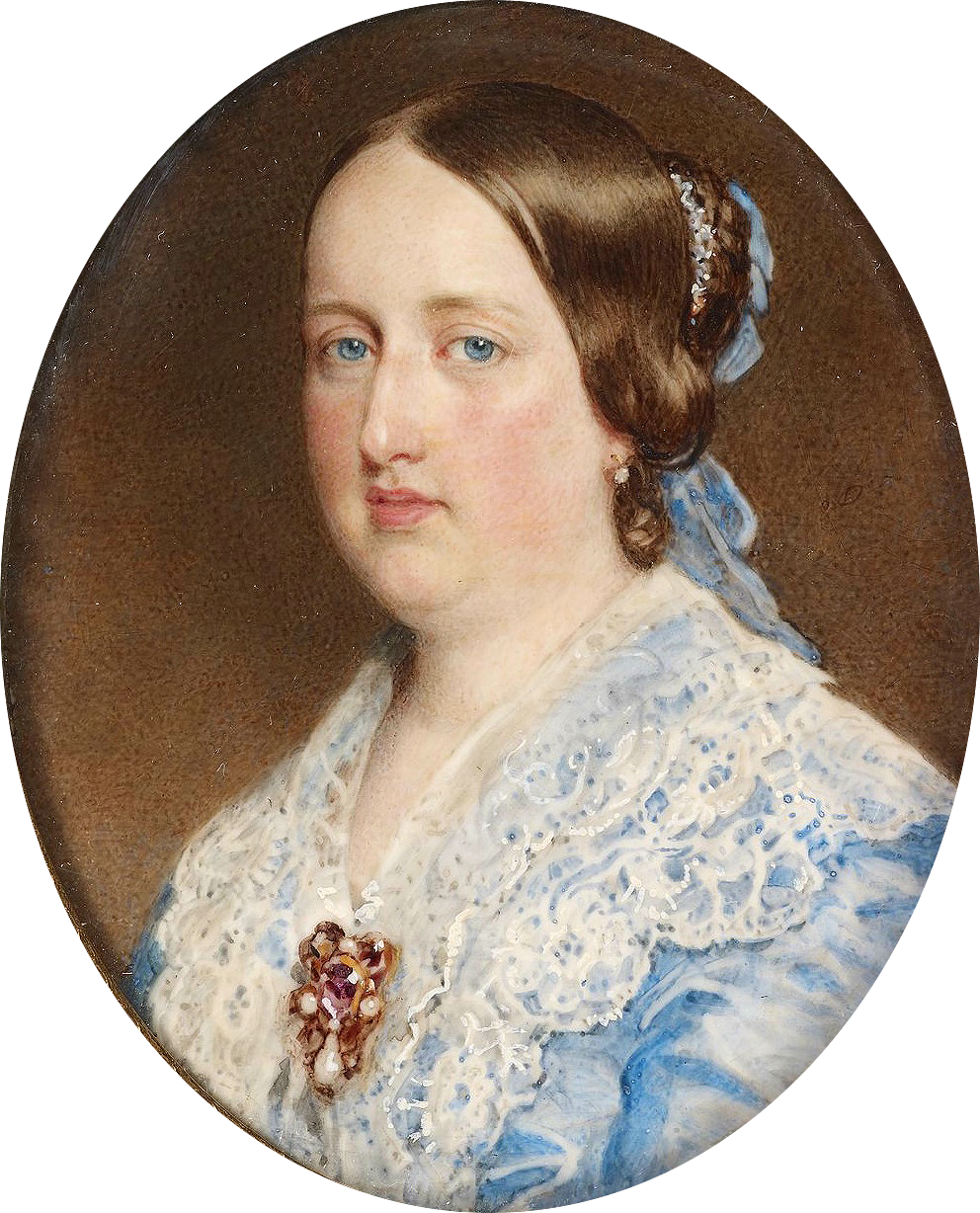
Maria II, Queen of Portugal, c. 1852.

Ross was born on 3 June 1794, in London, and descended from a Scottish family who had settled at Tain in Ross-shire. He was the son of William Ross, a miniature-painter and teacher of drawing, who exhibited at the Royal Academy from 1809 to 1825. His mother, Maria Smith, a sister of Anker Smith, the line-engraver, was a portrait-painter, who exhibited at the Royal Academy between 1791 and 1814, and died in London on 20 March 1836, aged 70.

At an early age young Ross showed great ability in art, and in 1807 received the "lesser silver palette" from the Society of Arts for a copy in chalk of Anker Smith's engraving of James Northcote's "Death of Wat Tyler". In 1808, he was admitted into the schools of the Royal Academy, where he received from Benjamin West much kind advice, and in 1810 gained a silver medal for a drawing from life. The Society of Arts also, in 1808, awarded him a silver medal for an original drawing of the "Judgment of Solomon", and in 1809 the larger silver palette for an original miniature of "Venus and Cupid", which he exhibited with two other works, "Mordecai Rewarded" and "The Judgment of Solomon", at the Royal Academy in the same year.

For some years afterwards his exhibited works were mainly of a classical character, and in 1825 he sent to the Royal Academy a large picture representing "Christ casting out Devils". In 1810, he again received a silver medal, and 20 guineas, from the Society of Arts, for an original drawing of "Caractacus brought before Claudius Cæsar"; in 1811, the silver medal and twenty guineas for an original drawing of "Samuel presented to Eli"; in 1816, the gold Isis medal for an original portrait of the Duke of Norfolk, president of the society; and in 1817, the gold medal for an original historical painting, "The Judgment of Brutus".

At the age of twenty he became an assistant to Andrew Robertson (1777–1845), the eminent Scottish miniature-painter, and, although his first ambition was to excel in historical painting, he thought it advisable to concentrate on the more lucrative speciality of miniature-painting. He soon acquired a sizeable and elite clientele. In 1837 Queen Victoria and the Duchess of Kent sat for him, and in succeeding years Queen Adelaide, the Prince Consort, the royal children, and various members of the royal families of France, Belgium, Portugal, and Saxe-Coburg. He is known to have produced more than 2,200 miniatures, of which about 300 were exhibited at the Royal Academy. Those of Queen Victoria and of the Prince Consort were engraved by Henry Thomas Ryall; that of the Duchess of Nemours by Charles Heath, for the "Keepsake" of 1843 (a short-lived art annual); that of Prince Louis Napoleon Bonaparte, by F. J. Joubert; and those of Charlotte, Duchess of Marlborough, and of James, 3rd Marquis of Ormonde, by W. J. Edwards.

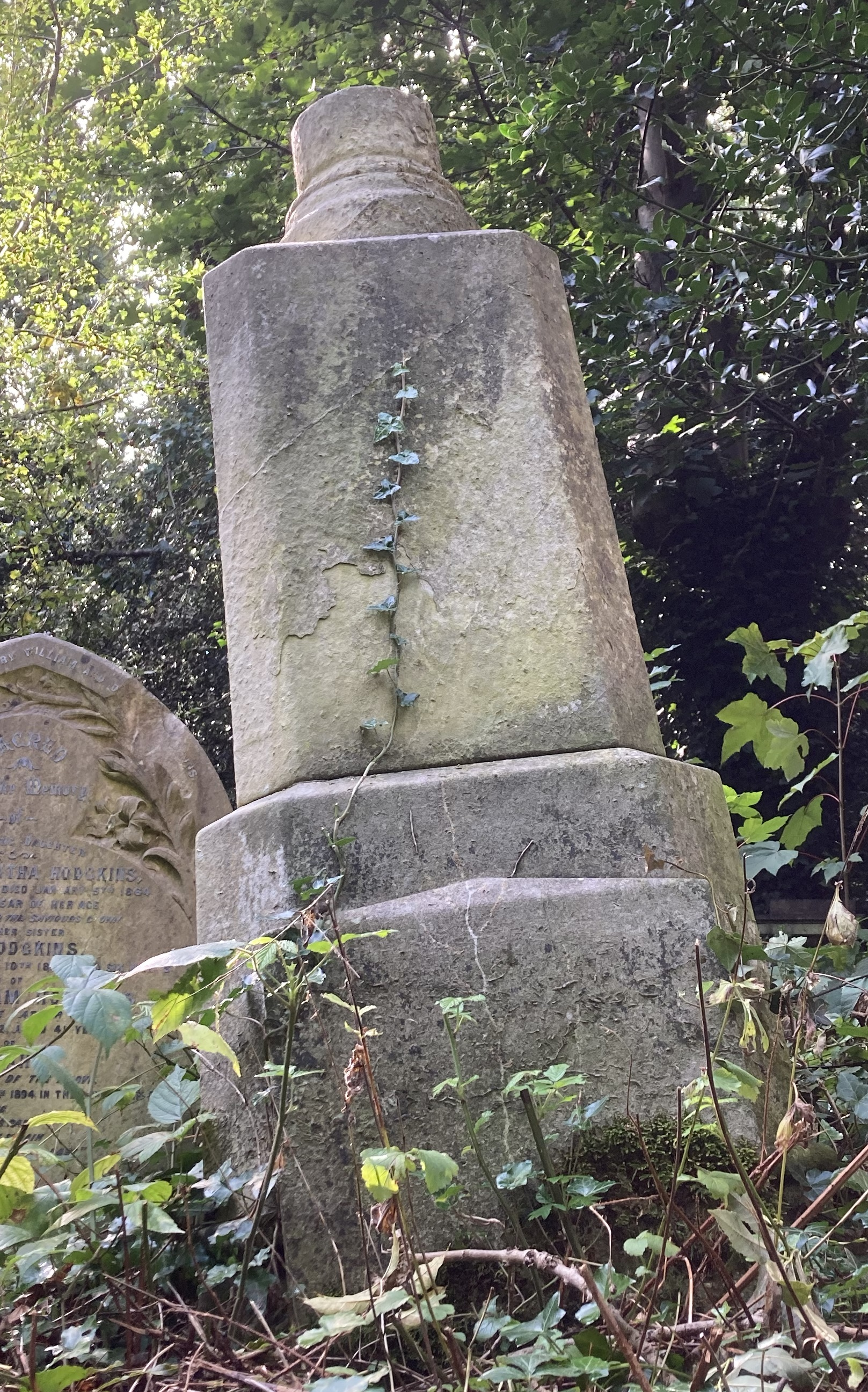
Grave of Sir William Charles Ross in Highgate Cemetery

He was elected an associate of the Royal Academy in 1838, and in 1843 a royal academician, and was knighted on 1 June 1842. The Westminster Hall competition of 1843 led him to turn his hand once more to historical composition, and he sent a cartoon of "The Angel Raphael discoursing with Adam", which was awarded an extra premium of £100.

He continued to hold a preeminent position amongst miniature-painters until 1857, when he was struck down by paralysis while engaged on portraits of the Duke and Duchess of Aumale, with their two sons. He never entirely recovered, and died unmarried at his home at 38 Fitzroy Square, London, on 20 January 1860. He was buried on the western side of Highgate cemetery (plot no.10093). The memorial, which is in an elevated position on the western side of the cutting path, no longer has a decipherable inscription and is leaning.

== Family ==
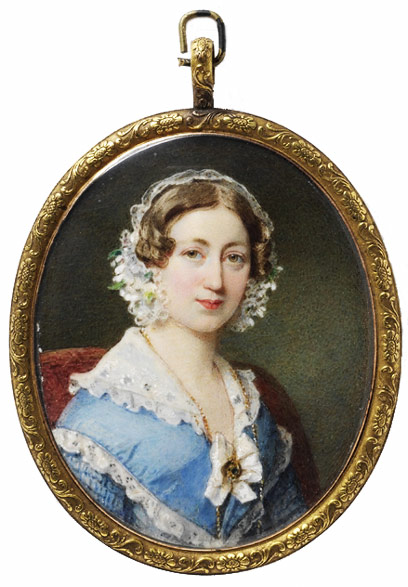
Portrait miniature of Ross's sister Magdalena Dalton (c. 1835–40, Watercolour on ivory)

Hugh Ross (1800–1873), younger brother of Sir William Charles Ross, was also a miniature-painter, and exhibited at the Royal Academy from 1814 to 1845. Magdalene Ross (1801–1874), a sister, who likewise practised the same branch of art, exhibited at the Royal Academy between 1820 and 1856; she married Edwin Dalton, a portrait-painter.

== Legacy ==
Ross's portrait was painted by Thomas Henry Illidge, and engraved on wood for The Art Journal of 1849; a miniature was also painted by his brother, Hugh Ross. An exhibition of miniatures by him was held at the Society of Arts early in 1860, and in June his remaining works were sold by the auctioneers Christie, Manson & Woods.

Ross held the same position with respect to miniature-painters that Thomas Lawrence did among portrait-painters. Writing for the Dictionary of National Biography, Robert Edmund Graves noted that "others have surpassed him in power of expression, but in refinement, in purity of colour, and in truth, he had no rival. His portraits of men are marked by a strong individuality, while his women charm by their grace and delicacy".

== Gallery ==
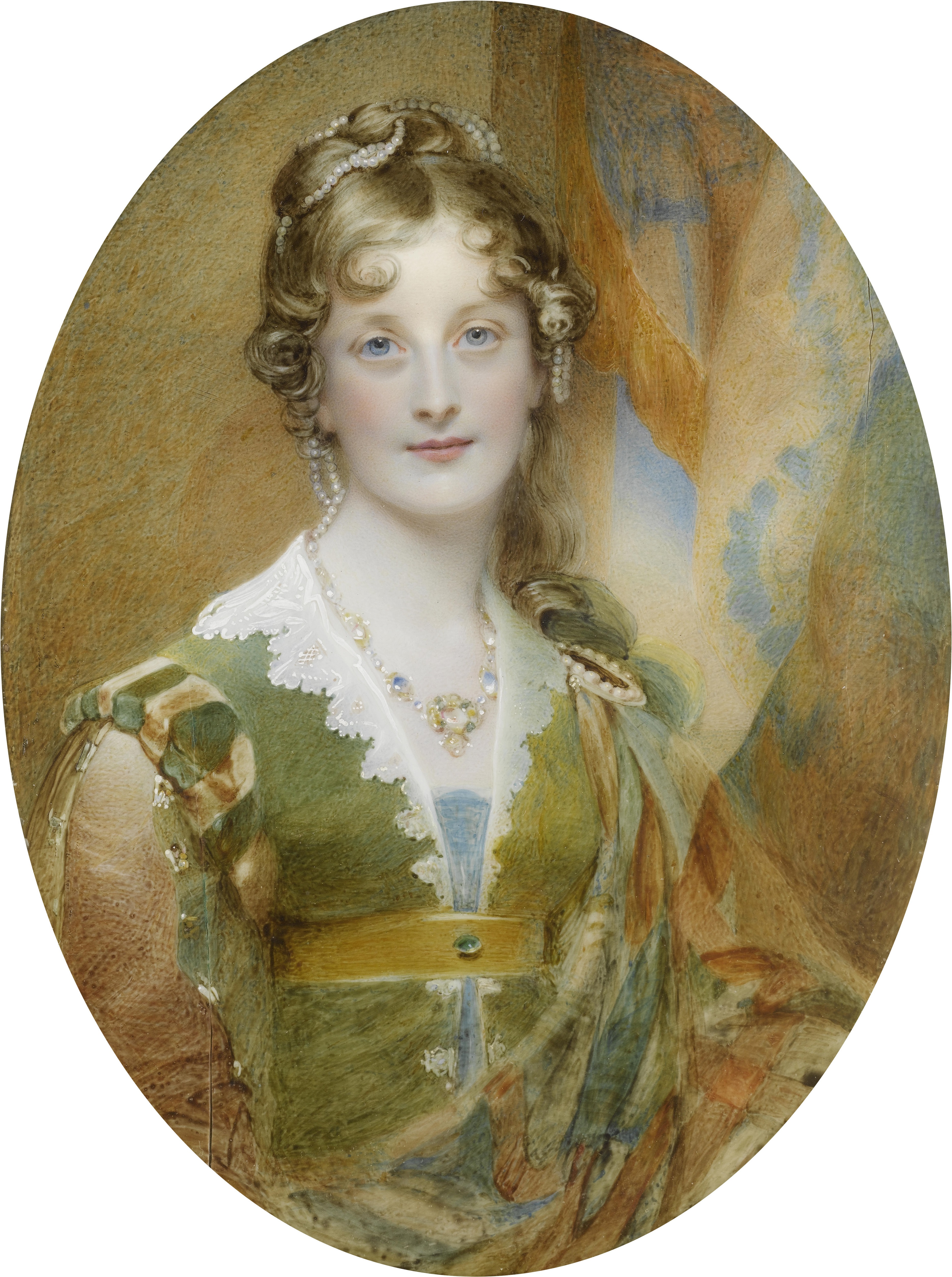
Jane Digby, Lady Ellenborough (1807-1881)

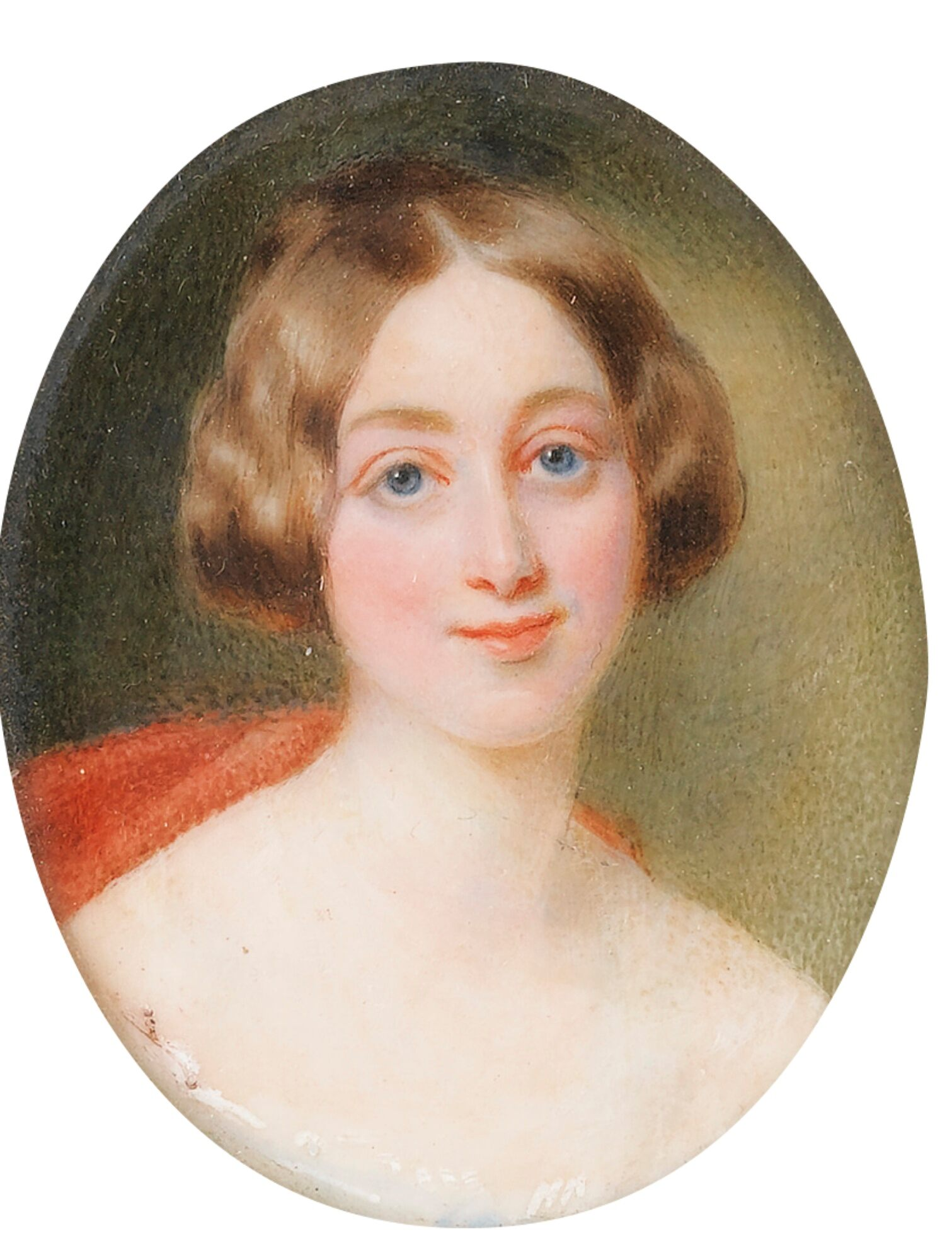
Zénaïde Clary, Princesse et Duchesse de Wagram

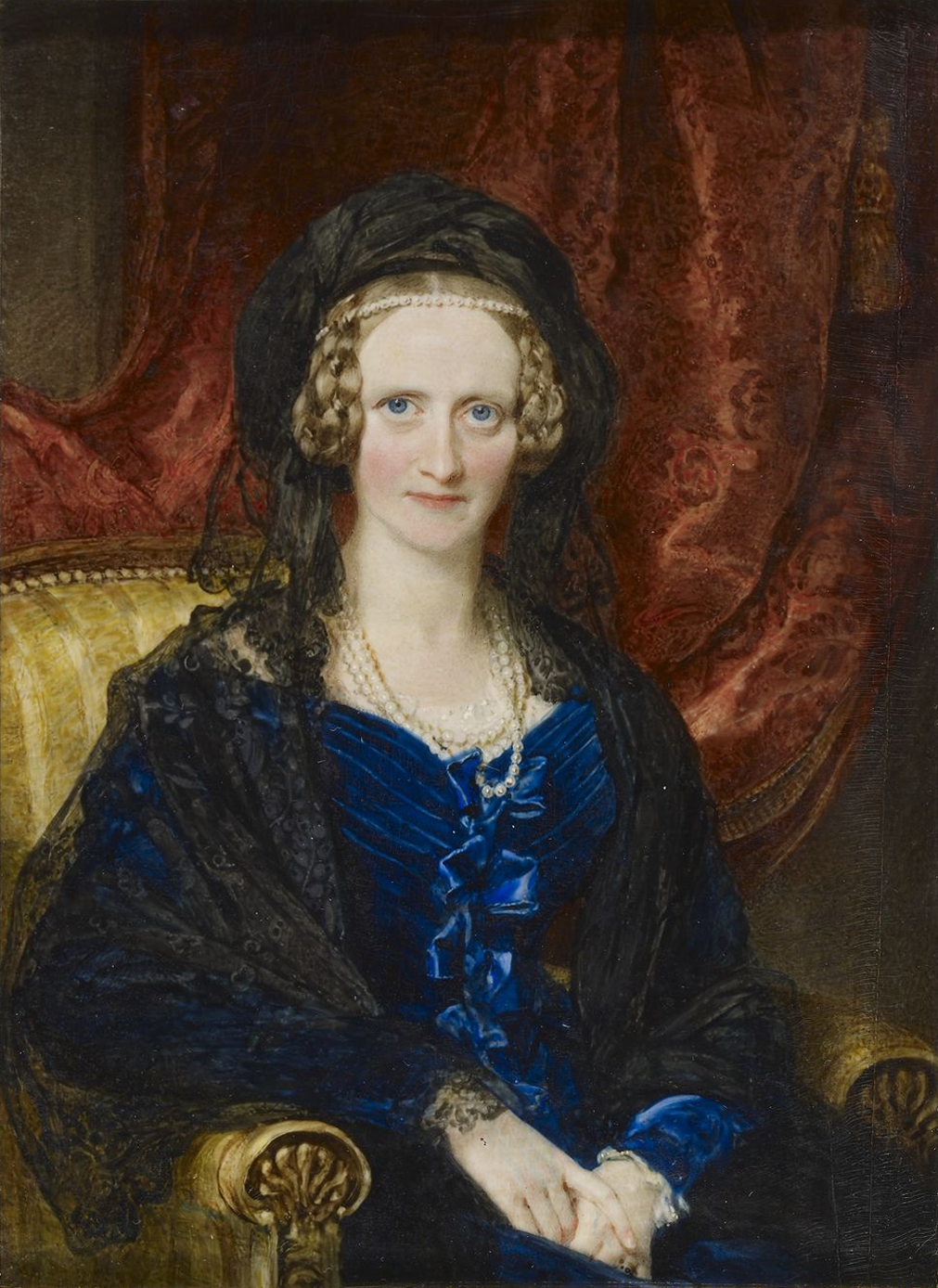
Queen Adelaide of the United Kingdom, 1844

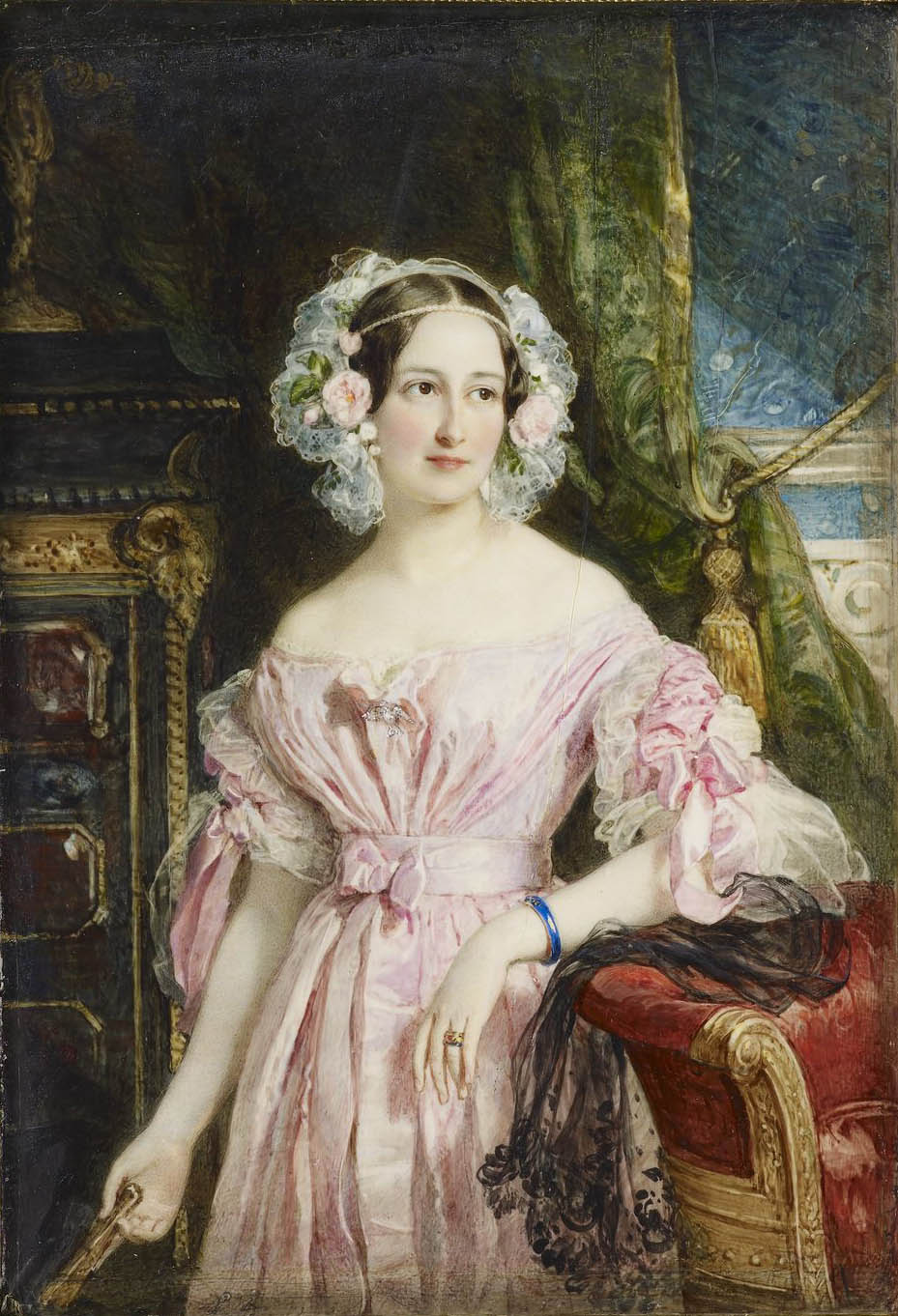
Feodora, Princess of Hohenlohe-Langenburg (1807-1872), sister of Queen Victoria of the United Kingdom (1819-1901).

King Ferdinand II of Portugal, 1852

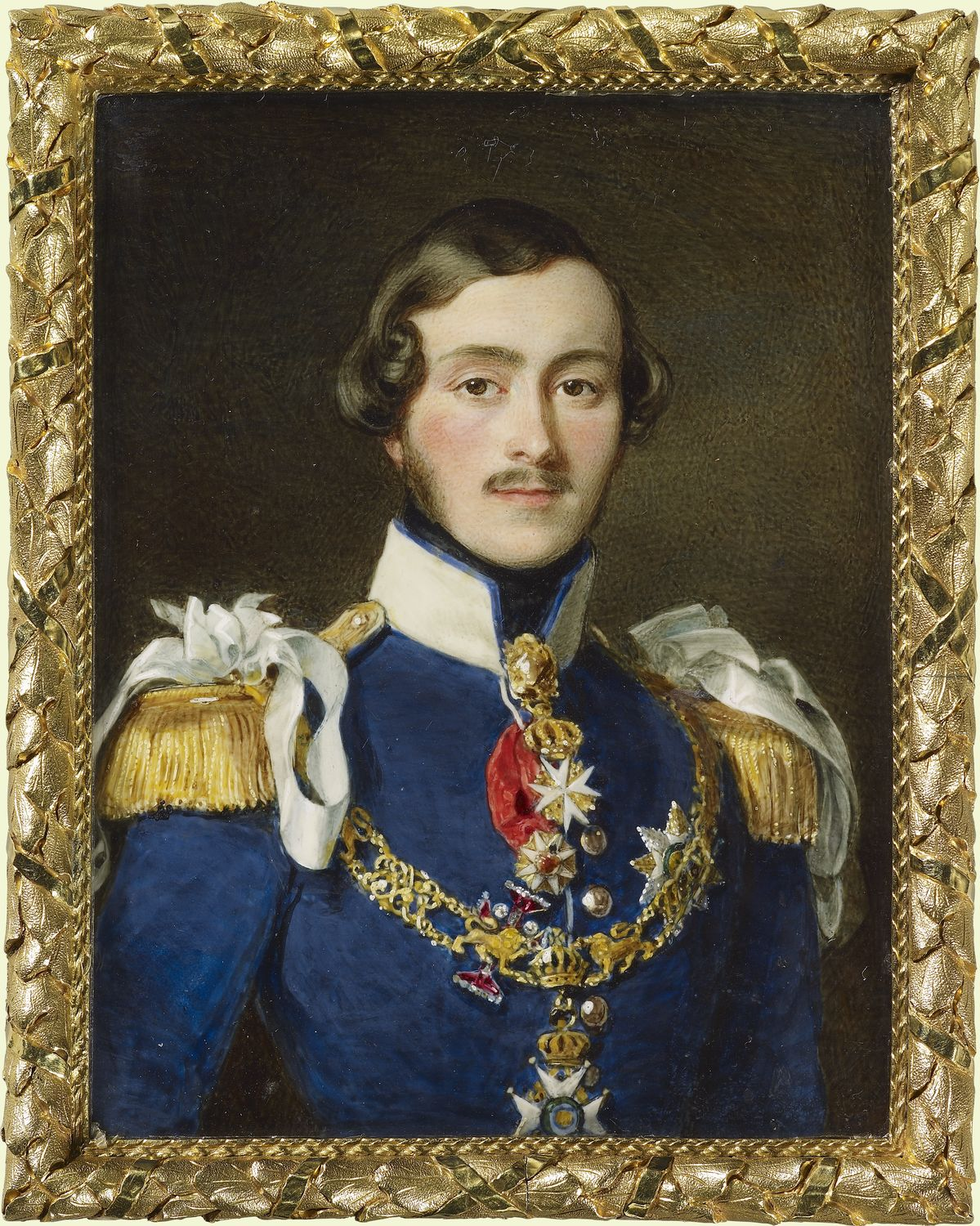
Ernest II, Duke of Saxe-Coburg-Gotha (1818-1893) when Hereditary Prince of Saxe-Coburg-Gotha.
