= Photo-crayotype =

Process to hand colour photographic prints

Photo-crayotypes (also known as Chromatypes and Crayon Collotypes) were an artistic process used for the hand-colouring of photographs by the application of crayons and pigments over a photographic impression.

== History ==
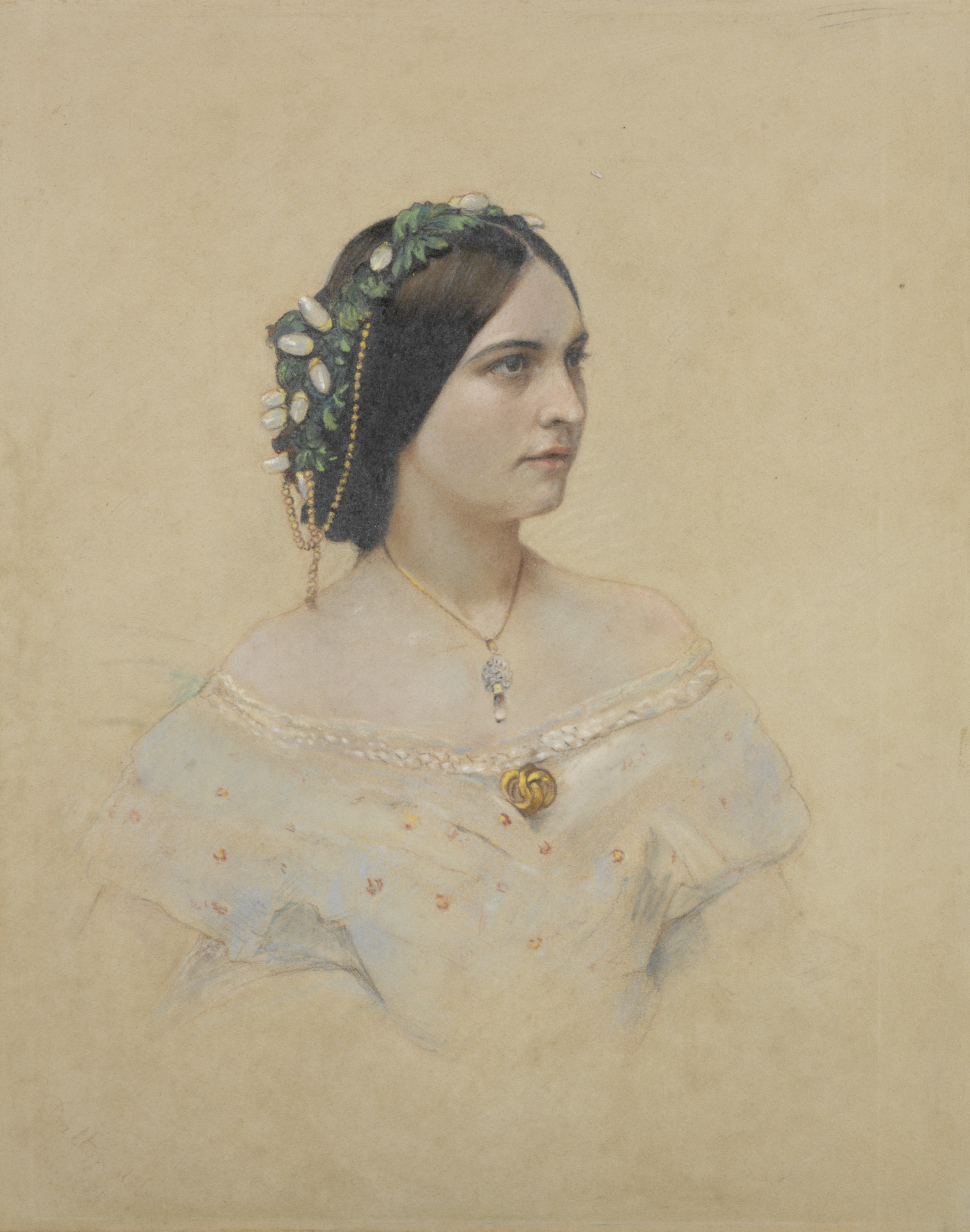
Mrs Frances Jones, studio portrait, Sydney, 1859, by Edward Dalton, crayotype

From its inception in 1839, photographers had been using pigments to hand colour photographs. The most common method used was the addition of colour to the finished daguerreotype, ambrotype or print. But by the 1850s there were two well-established processes based on using photographs as the base layer over which pigments were applied. The first involved printing a light photographic positive on salted paper using a toned or bleached negative to lower the contrast. The other, producing what is generally referred to as a “crayon enlargement”, was to use a magic lantern to project the photograph onto the rear of drawing paper or a canvas. Both of these provided a photographic image which could then be used as the base from which to colour in the features using crayons, oils or watercolours.

== England ==
The English photographer John Jabez Mayall took out a patent on chromotypes as early as 1852 and the process was published in the Photographic Journal in 1853.

== Australia ==
An early Australian proponent of this kind of work was the English painter and photographer Frederick Frith who moved to Australia around 1853. By 1855 he was advertising salt paper prints finished in oils, watercolours or crayons which he called ‘Chromatypes’. These he claimed were made using a special apparatus (perhaps an enlarging camera) manufactured expressly for him by Voigtlander and Son, of Vienna. In October 1856 Douglas Kilburn, of Melbourne, created a sensation selling life sized ‘chromotypes’ which appear to have used the same process as Frith.

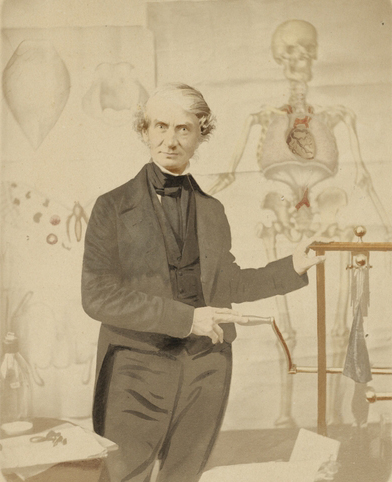
Dr. Edward Swarbreck Hall, 1858, chromatype [attributed], by Frederick Frith

The following year similar processes were being touted by Sydney photographers. On 29 August 1857, three advertisements, one following the other, promoted photographs overpainted with crayons, oils or watercolours. In the first of these the photographer William Hetzer praised the way in which this process combined the merits of photography with the softness and harmony of aquatinta prints.

In the second advertisement Freeman Brothers studio promoted their ‘Crayon Collotypes’ as combining the fidelity of photography with the brilliancy, softness, and transparency of miniatures on ivory. The last was an advertisement by Edward Dalton who was encouraging Sydney-siders to purchase his ‘Collodion Portraits’, which he believed had the delicacy and clearness of mezzotint engravings and when coloured possessed the finish and brilliancy of miniatures on ivory.

Dalton’s coloured photos must have differed in some way from the photo-crayotype he was promoting as his own discovery in 1858 but it is clear from the advertisements that the Australian photographers were using collodion plates as the basis for their images. This is significant for it means they were not using Talbot’s ‘calotype’ process which involved using paper negatives as the basis for the salt paper prints.

On 8 December 1858, Edward Dalton exhibited ‘photo-crayotypes’ which he claimed were created using a process he had invented. Just three years earlier Dalton had been drawing portraits entirely in crayons while also working as a collodion photographer. It is possible the combining these two processes seemed a natural extension of his talents which can be seen in the colouring work done on his ‘photo-crayotype’ of Mrs Frances Jones. But it is also true that Dalton’s ‘photo-crayotypes’ were similar to other processes which used photography as the base from which to overpaint with crayons, pencils, watercolours and oil paint.

In 1859 the Adelaide photographer Townsend Druyea also claimed to have also invented ‘crayon-photography’ but this was refuted in the South Australian Advertiser by Professor Hall. In the same article Hall pointed out that he had been using the process for the past five years and that the English photographer Mayall had taken out a patent on.

== Hungary ==
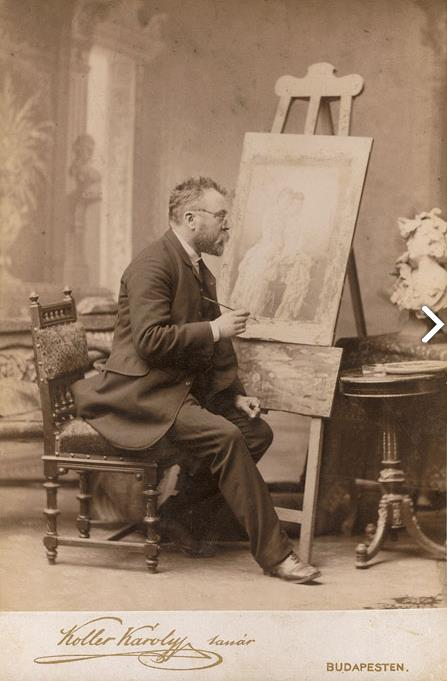
Károly Koller in his studio, 1889. Albumen cabinet print.

Chromotypes were produced in well-equipped studios in Hungary such as those of Lipót Strelisky, Ignác Schrecker, Ede Ellinger and his brother, István Goszleth, József Heller, Emil Keglovich, Károly Koller, Ferenc Kozmata, Ede Kozics, and László Naschitz.
