= Stanhope lens =

Type of microscope

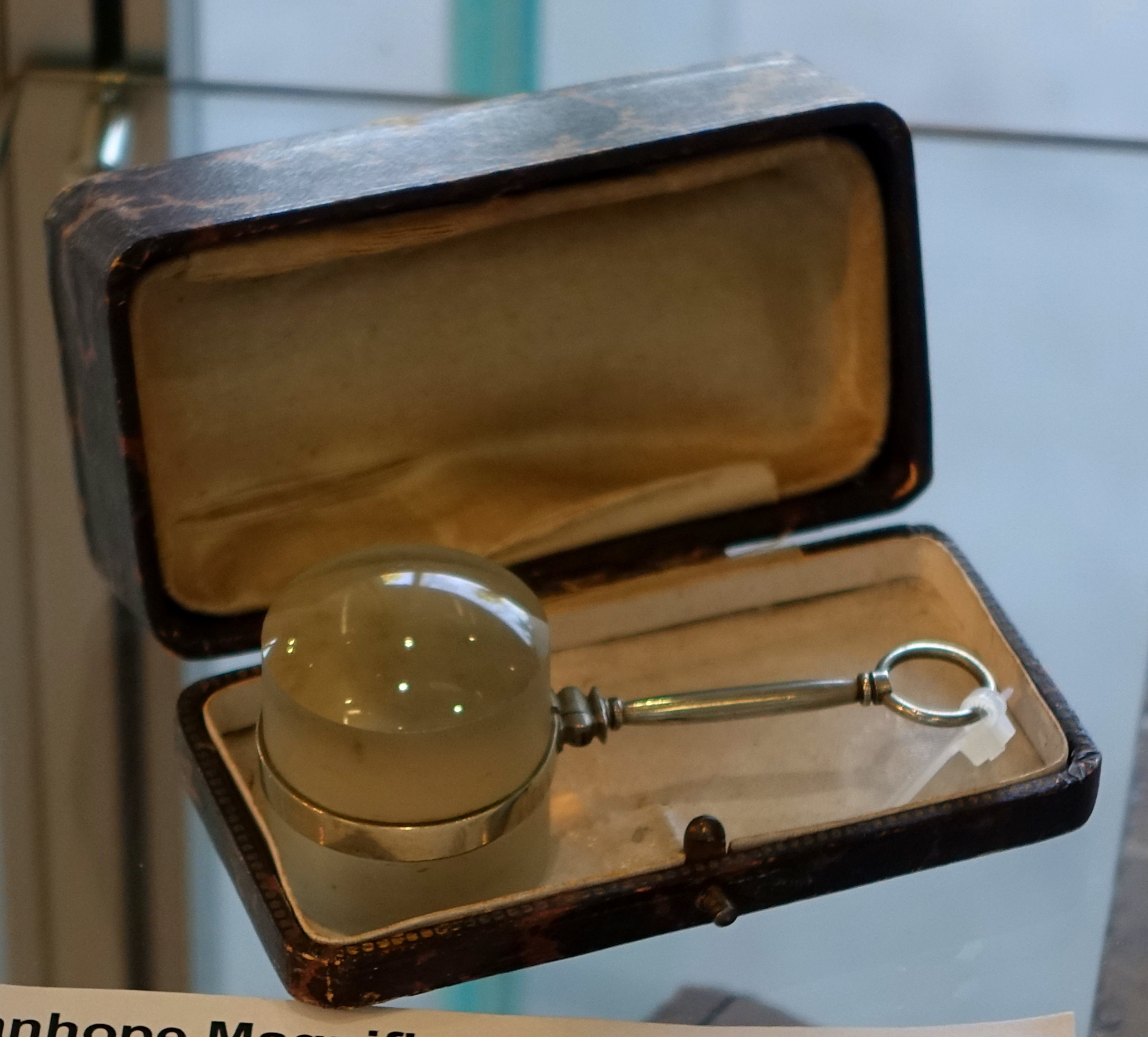
Stanhope lens with case, early 1800s

A Stanhope lens is a simple, one-piece microscope invented by Charles, the third Earl of Stanhope. It is a cylinder of glass with each end curved outwards, one being more convex than the other. The focal length of the apparatus is at or within the device so that objects to be studied are placed close to or in contact with the less curved end. Because its construction is simple and economical, it was popular in the 19th century. It was useful in medical practice for examining transparent materials such as crystals and fluids.

René Dagron modified the lens by keeping one curved end to refract light while sectioning the other end flat and locating it at the focal plane of the curved side. Dagron used the modified Stanhope lens in mounting his microscopic pictures in photographic jewels known as Stanhopes.

A rival lens is the Coddington magnifier. This was considered superior as a magnifier but was more expensive.
