= Frederick Frith =

English painter and photographer

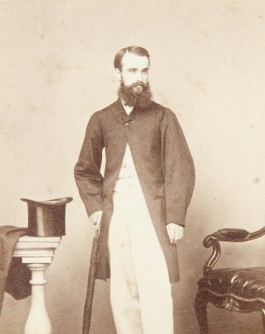
- Born: 1819; United Kingdom
- Died: 1871 (aged 51–52); Melbourne
- Occupation: Photographer And Painter
- Years active: 1853-1871
- Spouse: Emma Golding
- Parent: John Frith (Father) Letitia née Gardiner (Mother)
- Relatives: Henry Frith (Brother) Letitia Davidson (Sister)

Frederick Frith (1819–1871) was an English painter and photographer. He began his career in England but later moved to Australia where he lived in Hobart and Melbourne.

== Early life ==
Frederick Frith was born in the United Kingdom. He was from an English family consisting of painters and silhouettists. His parents were John Frith and Letitia née Gardiner, he had a younger brother, Henry Albert and a younger sister, Letitia. In 1858 he married Emma Golding (1832–1917).

== Early career ==
He studied and practiced painting in London, Brighton, Ireland and Scotland. In 1853 he was asked to showcase his artworks including Death of a Stag. In 1855 he moved to Melbourne, Australia and began work as a painter, then moved to Hobart later that year. He exhibited his artwork in Melbourne in 1854 which consisted mainly of his watercolour and oil paintings.

== Partnership with John Mathieson Sharp ==
In 1855 while he was exhibiting his artwork, he met John Mathieson Sharp. They later became partners and worked in a studio which Sharp had just bought. They named the studio the Chromatype Gallery. "Chroma" is the Greek word for colour, and referred to his method of overpainting salted paper prints with oil, watercolour and/or pastel. Only a few dozen of their Chromatype artworks remain, but they show how they coloured these paper photographs. This process was similar to works often referred to as a Photo-crayotype.

== Panorama ==
Sharp and Frith produced the first paper panorama taken in Australia; a five-part, near-metre long panoramic view of Hobart, using the collodion or wet-plate process. Copies were advertised for sale in the 18 January 1856 edition of the Tasmania Daily News. This panorama was seen as the first proper panorama and what started the trades of albums and prints that they sold to the community.

== Civil lawsuit ==
In 1855 Frith brought a civil suit against a Hobart Town merchant, Samuel Moses. Frith painted Samuel and his family but Samuel refused to pay him arguing they were overpriced and lacked effort and passion that he believed Frith should have shown. Although true that his paintings weren't at their best, Conway Hart and Alfred Bock brought forth that Frith's paintings were defective in colour and composition which was considered not of the standard of a trained artist. In the end Frith won the case and won compensation along with the cost for damages.

== Partnership with Henry Frith ==
In 1856 the partnership between Frith and Sharp came to an end; Sharp continued to make chromatypes and stereographs in his studio in Hobart. Frith began his own studio, working less on paintings and focusing more on photography as well as making large format views of Hobart and surrounds. A year later Frith's brother, Henry joined his business and did a lot of the travelling for the studio. Later in 1858, Frith presented two panoramas both taken in Hobart. The two photos were taken at the Domain and St Paul's Church. In 1858 the Frith brothers opened a second studio located at Launceston. As well as the panoramas, they sold individual prints and albums. They advertised bound albums of 3-6 views for five guineas or for one guinea per print in the Launceston newspaper Cornwall Chronicle on 12 March 1859. Their sister, Letitia Davidson continued to operate the studio in Hobart as Frith & Co.'.

Frederick's artworks were very popular, but they were quite over priced which led to more court cases. He once again showcased his Death of a Stag piece in the Hobart Town Art Treasures Exhibition which earned him more profit and proved it was one of his most famous pieces.

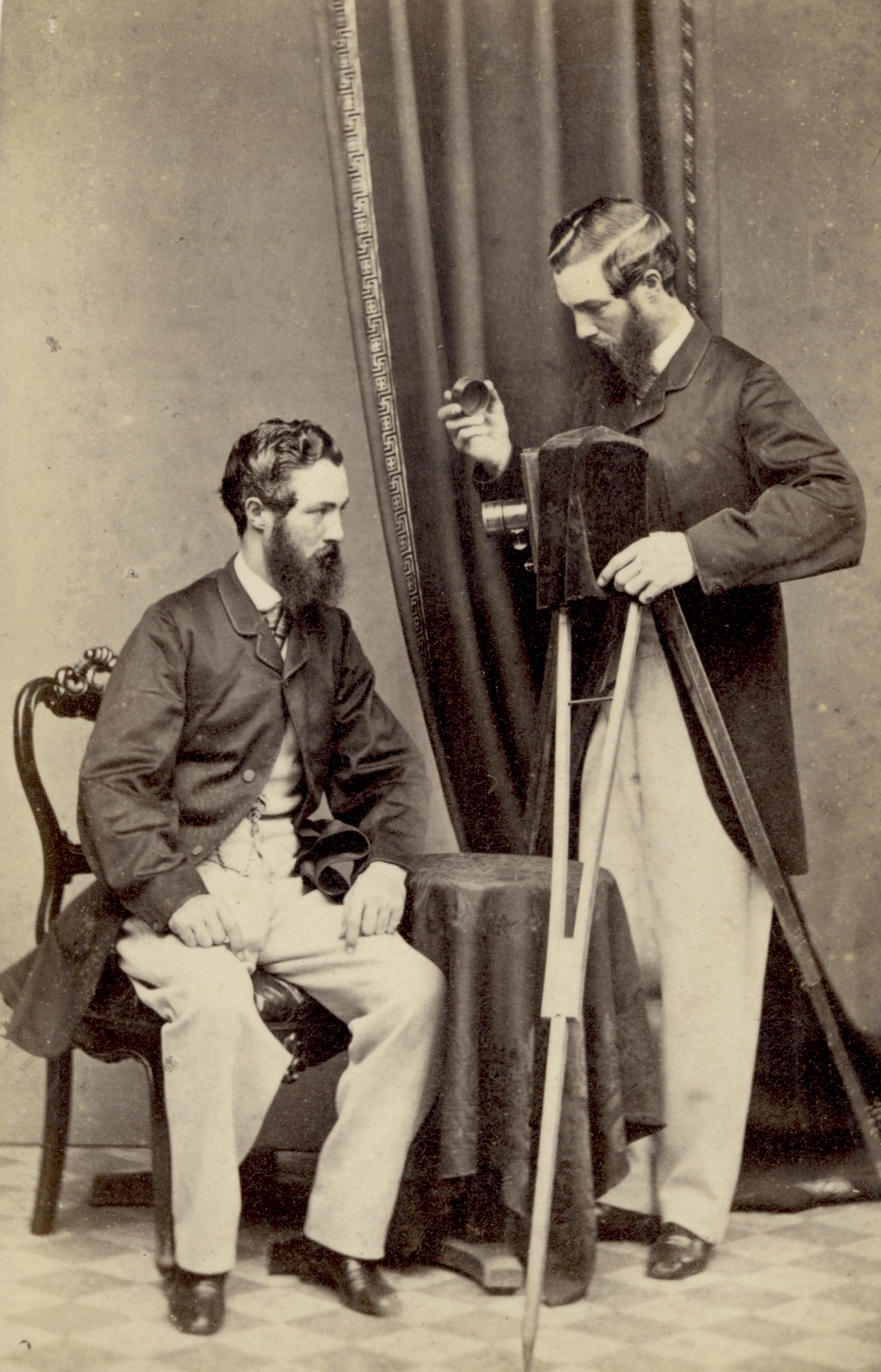
To achieve this double portrait, Frith used a masking plate holder between two exposures to capture the image.

== Double portrait ==
Around 1866 Frith produced this 'double portrait' to advertise his technical skill. He could have used either an opaque screen between two exposures or a masking plate holder. Frith's camera didn't have a shutter because the wet plate process that was used at the time required an exposure of several seconds.

== Death ==
Frederick Frith died in 1871. He will be remembered for his unique style of achieving shots that seemed very difficult to most other photographers. Although his life was short lived, he certainly left behind an amazing series of images that will be remembered for many years to come. Throughout his career Frith seemed more interested in painting, especially when he was working with his former partner John Sharp - Sharp was known as the photographer, Frith the painter. By using photography and painting, many of his portrait photographs looked like watercolour paintings.
