= Stanhope (optical bijou) =

Optical instrument

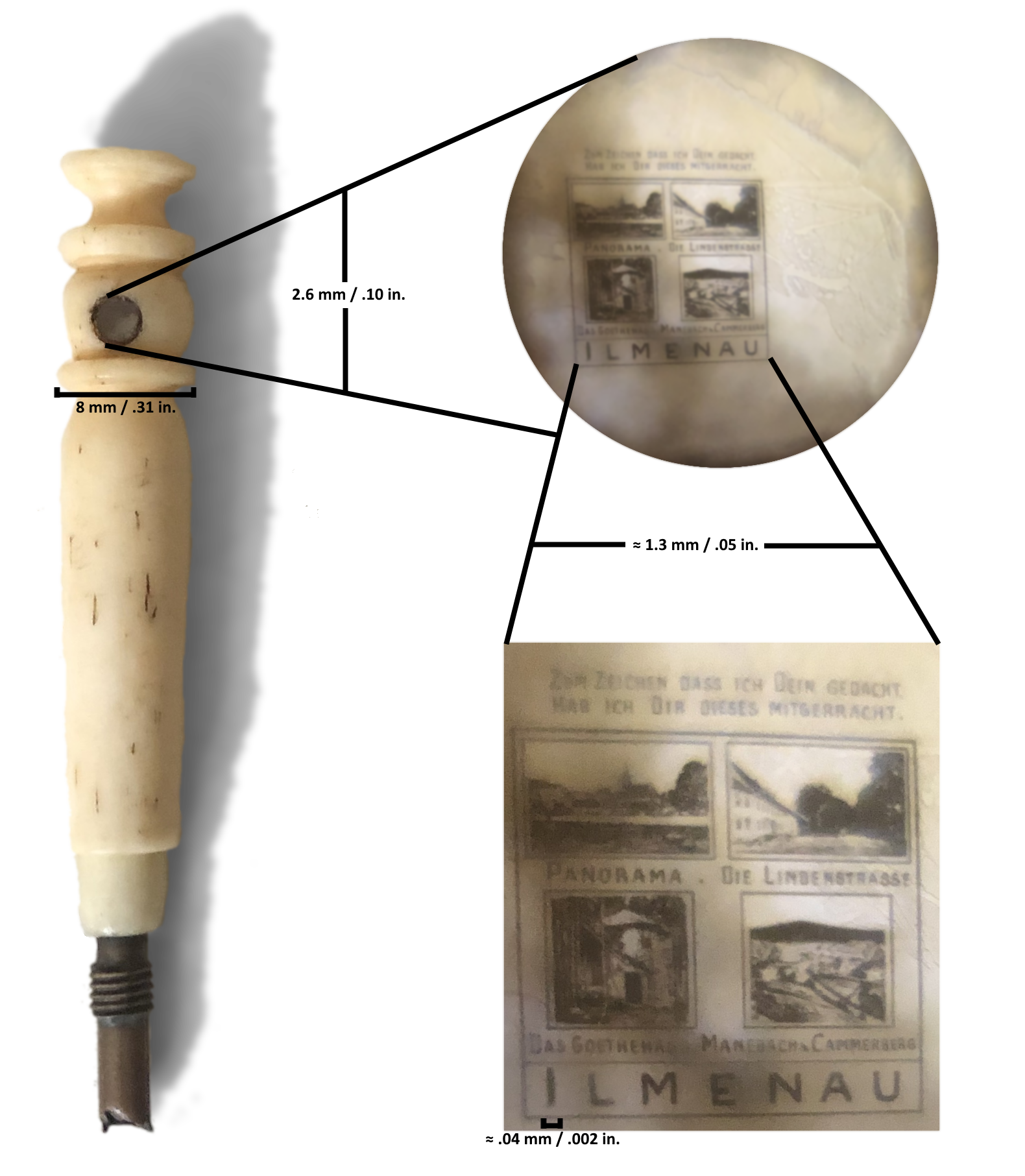
A stanhope featuring the city of Ilmenau, Germany with the photographs contained inside it

A stanhope or stanho-scope is an optical device that enables the viewing of microphotographs without using a microscope. They were invented by René Dagron in 1857. Dagron bypassed the need for an expensive microscope to view the microscopic photographs by attaching the microphotograph at the end of a modified Stanhope lens. He called the devices bijoux photo-microscopiques or microscopic photo-jewelry.

== History ==
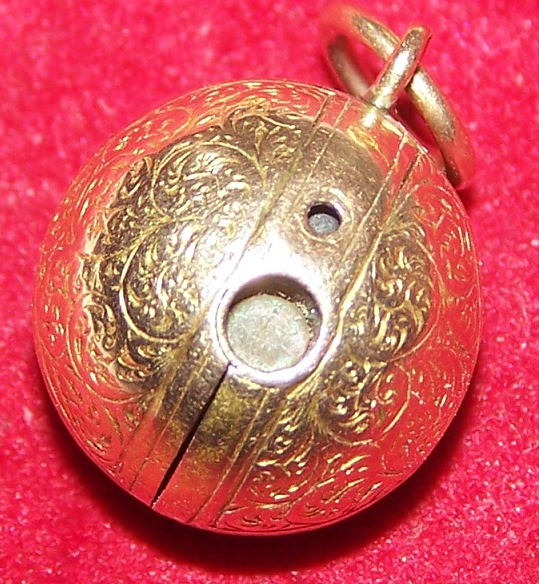
Stanhope ball. The viewing lens cylinder is located at the smaller diameter opening

=== Invention and development ===
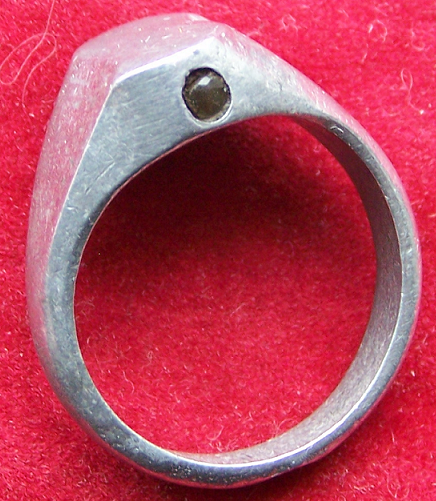
Stanhope ring

In 1851 John Benjamin Dancer invented microphotographs using a collodion process and a microscope converted to a camera. This resulted in a microphotograph about 3 square millimetres (0.0047 sq in) in area. The main disadvantage of Dancer's method was that the viewing of the microphotographs required a microscope which was at the time an expensive instrument.

In 1857 René Dagron solved the problem by inventing a method of mounting the microphotographs at the end of a small cylindrical lens. Dagron modified the Stanhope lens by sectioning the normally biconvex Stanhope lens and introducing a planar section so that the plane was located at the focal length of the convex side of the cylindrical lens. This produced a plano-convex lens, where Dagron was able to mount the microscopic photograph on the flat side of the lens using Canada balsam as adhesive. This arrangement enabled the picture to be focused.

The sectioned lens could magnify the microphotograph three hundred times, so that the viewing of the microphotographs no longer required a bulky and expensive microscope. The modified Stanhope lens was small enough to be mounted in all manner of miniature artifacts such as rings, ivory miniatures, wooden toys etc. Dagron also designed a special microphotographic camera which could produce 450 exposures approximately 2 by 2 millimetres (0.079 in × 0.079 in) on a 4.5-by-8.5-centimetre (1.8 in × 3.3 in) wet collodion plate.

The Stanhope optical viewers were mounted inside the bows of violins by French violin maker Jean-Baptiste Vuillaume, probably using Dagron's methods and equipment. The violin Stanhopes featured the portraits of famous people such as Paganini, Tourte, and Stradivari.

=== Mass production and fame ===
Dagron's efforts met with great success. The viewers were first introduced to the general public at the 1859 International Fair in Paris. The success of his viewers enabled Dagron to purpose-build a factory dedicated to their production. As of June 1859, Dagron's factory was manufacturing the stanhopes, mounted in jewellery and souvenirs. In August 1859 he exhibited them at the International Exhibition in Paris where they met with great success. In 1862 he had 150 employees and was manufacturing 12,000 units a day. In 1860 Dagron obtained the patent for his viewers under the title Bijoux Photomicroscopiques. Dagron also developed mail order marketing techniques for his viewers.

In 1862 Dagron published his book Cylindres photo-microscopiques, montés et non montés sur bijoux. That same year, Dagron displayed the devices at the 1862 International Exhibition in London, where he received an "Honourable Mention" and presented them to Queen Victoria.

In 1864 Dagron became famous when he produced a stanhope optical viewer which enabled the viewing of a microphotograph 1 square millimetre (0.0016 sq in), (equivalent in size to the head of a pin), that included the portraits of 450 people.

=== Twentieth century onwards ===
In the early twentieth century Eugène Reymond took control of Dagron's Stanhope lens factory in Gex, France. He was succeeded in the management of the factory by his son Roger. In 1972 the factory, run by Roger Remond, produced the last Stanhope lens made by the traditional methods. In 1998, after Roger's death, the workshop was closed and its equipment dismantled and sold. Stanhope lenses are still manufactured to this day, but they are not produced according to Dagron's methodology.

In modern times, the most common Stanhopes are usually gold or silver crosses with Christian prayers in the microphotograph.

== See also ==
- Optical storage – Method to store and retrieve computer data using optics
