= Henry Coddington =

Henry Coddington FRS
- Born: Oldbridge, County Meath
- Died: Rome
- Education: Trinity College, Cambridge
- Known for: Coddington magnifier Coddington notation
- Awards: Smith's Prize (1820); FRS (1829)
- Scientific career
- Fields: Optics

Henry Coddington (1798/9, Oldbridge, County Meath — 3 March 1845, Rome) was an Anglo-Irish natural philosopher, fellow and tutor of Trinity College, Cambridge and Church of England clergyman.

== Life ==
Henry Coddington was the son of Latham Coddington, Rector of Timolin, Kildare. Admitted to Trinity College, Cambridge in 1816, Coddingtion graduated BA as Senior Wrangler in 1820, and first Smith's prizeman; proceeded M.A. in 1823, and obtained a fellowship and sub-tutorship in his college. He retired to the college living of Ware in Hertfordshire, and in the discharge of his clerical duties burst a blood-vessel, thereby fatally injuring his health.

Coddington was vicar of Ware, Hertfordshire from 1832 to 1845. Advised to try a southern climate, he travelled abroad, and died at Rome 3 March 1845.

== Family ==
He married a daughter of Dr. Batten, principal of Haileybury College, and left seven children.

== Legacy ==
He wrote chiefly on optics, in particular An Elementary Treatise on Optics. He also made the Coddington magnifier popular. He was elected a Fellow of the Royal Society in February, 1829.

== Awards ==
His name occurs on the first list of members of the British Association. He was one of the earliest members of the Royal Astronomical Society, was a fellow of the Royal Geographical Society and Royal Society, and sat on the council of the latter body in 1831–2.

== See also ==
- Circle of confusion
- Pencil (optics)

== Sources ==
- W. W. Rouse Ball, A History of the Study of Mathematics at Cambridge University, 1889, repr. Cambridge University Press, 2009, ISBN 978-1-108-00207-3, p. 131
