= Collodion =

Flammable, syrupy solution of nitrocellulose in ether and alcohol

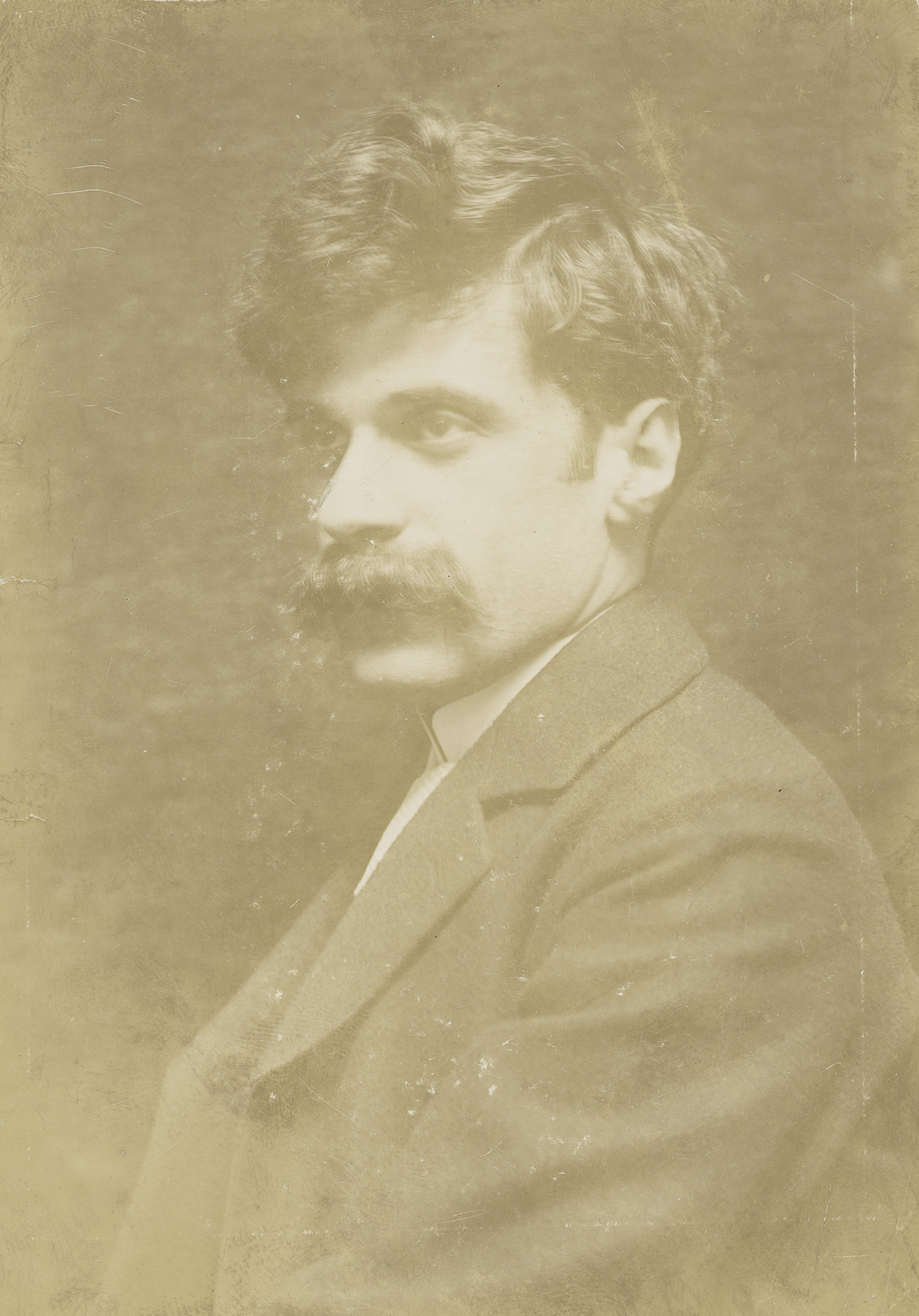
Alfred Stieglitz, c. 1894, collodion print by Frank S. Herrmann

Collodion is a flammable, syrupy solution of nitrocellulose in ether and alcohol. There are two basic types: flexible and non-flexible. The flexible type is often used as a surgical dressing or to hold dressings in place. When painted on the skin, collodion dries to form a flexible nitrocellulose film. While it is initially colorless, it discolors over time. Non-flexible collodion is often used in theatrical make-up. Collodion is also the basis of the photographic "collodion process", common through the later half of the nineteenth century until it was superseded by less cumbersome gelatin processes.

== History ==
In 1846, Louis-Nicolas Ménard and Florès Domonte discovered that cellulose nitrate could be dissolved in ether. They devised a mixture of ether as the solvent and ethanol as a diluent that rendered cellulose nitrate into a clear gelatinous liquid. Collodion was first used medically as a dressing in 1847 by the Boston physician John Parker Maynard. The solution was dubbed "collodion" (from the Greek κολλώδης (kollodis), gluey) by Augustus Addison Gould of Boston, Massachusetts.

== Wet-plate collodion photography ==
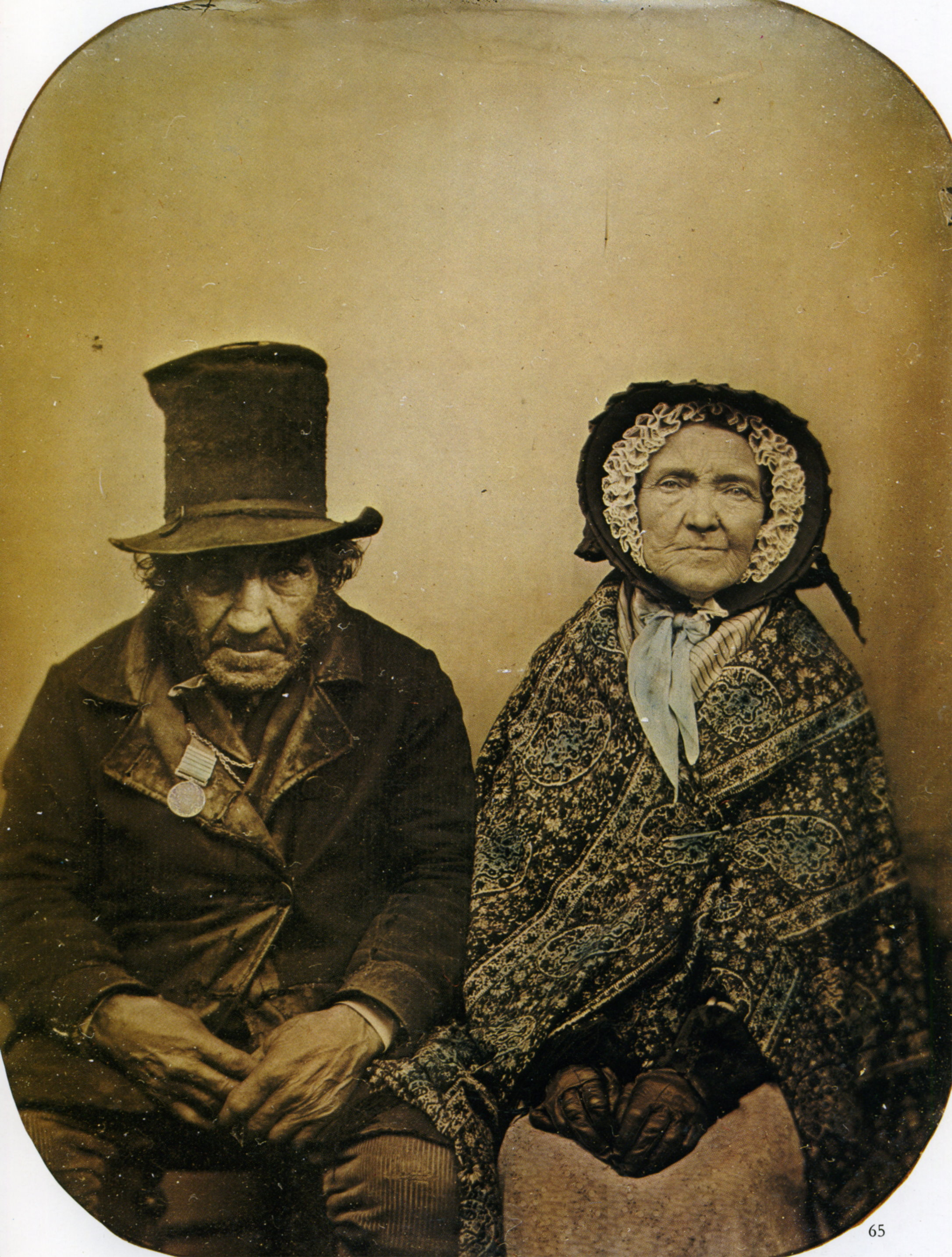
Anonymous "A Veteran with his Wife", ambrotype

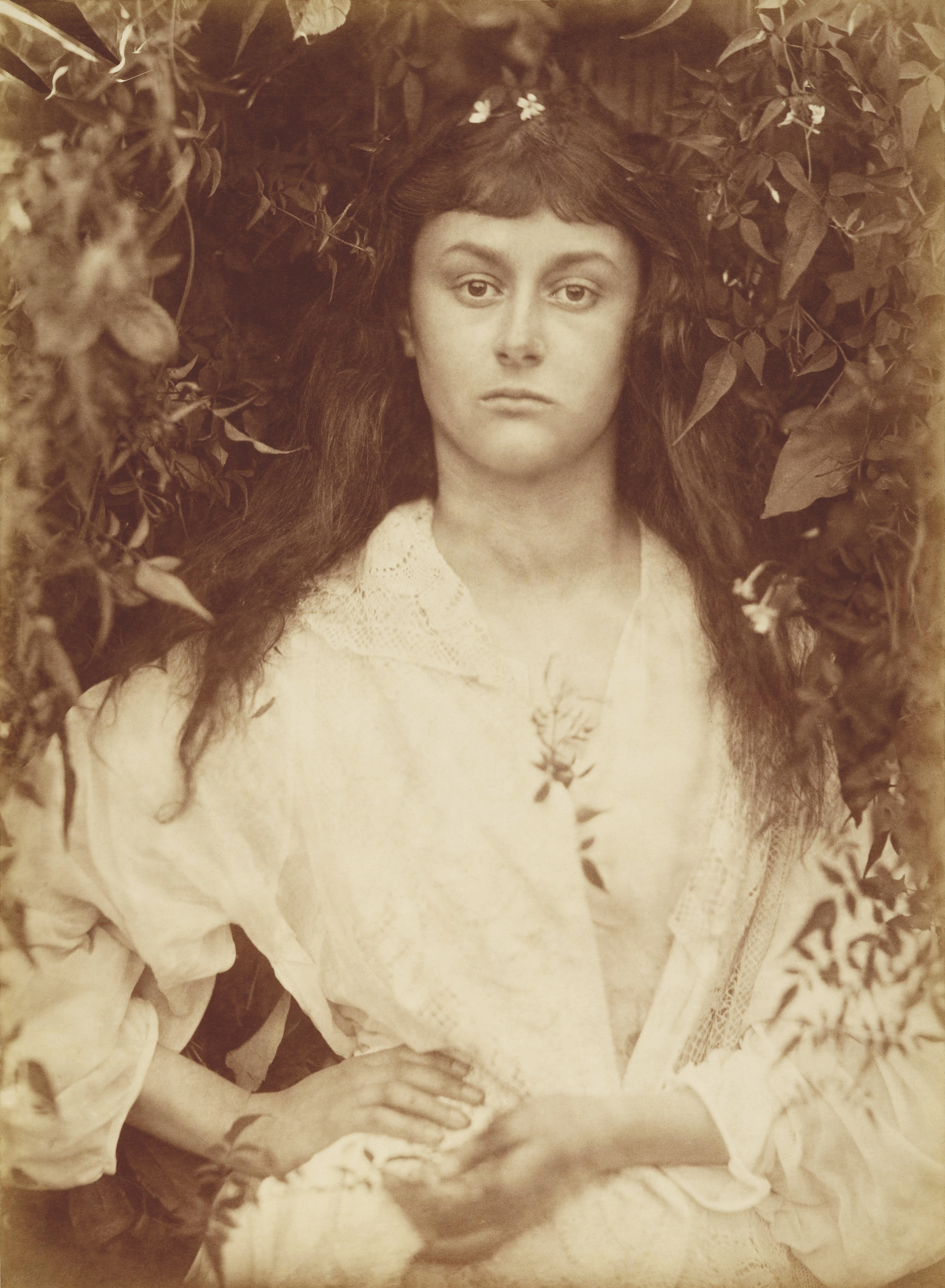
Julia Margaret Cameron's "Alice Liddell as a Young Woman" print from wet collodion negative

In 1851, Frederick Scott Archer, an Englishman, discovered that collodion could be used as an alternative to egg white (albumen) on glass photographic plates. Collodion reduced the exposure time necessary for making an image. This method became known as the "wet-plate collodion" or "wet collodion" method. Collodion was relatively grainless and colorless, and allowed for one of the first high-quality duplication processes, also known as negatives. This process also produced two types of positives: the ambrotype and the tintype (also known as ferrotype).

The process required great skill and included the following steps:

- Clean the glass plate (extremely well)
- In the light, pour "salted" (iodide, bromide) collodion onto the glass plate, tilting it so it reaches each corner. The excess is poured back into the bottle.
- Take the plate into a darkroom or orange tent (the plate is sensitive only to blue light) and immerse the plate in a silver nitrate sensitising bath (for 3–5 minutes)
- Lift the plate out of the bath, drain and wipe the back, load it into a plate holder and protect from light with a dark slide.
- Load the plate holder into the camera, withdraw the dark slide and expose the plate (can range from less than a second to several minutes)
- Develop the plate (using a ferrous sulfate based developer)
- Fix the plate (with potassium cyanide or sodium thiosulfate)

All of this was done in a matter of minutes, and some of the steps in (red) safelight conditions, which meant that the photographer had to carry the chemicals and a portable darkroom with him wherever he went. After these steps the plate needed rinsing in fresh water. Finally, the plate was dried and varnished using a varnish made from sandarac, alcohol and lavender oil.

Dark tents to be used outdoors consisted of a small tent that was tied around the photographer's waist. Otherwise a wheelbarrow or a horse and covered wagon were used.

== Dry collodion plates ==
Richard Hill Norris, a doctor of medicine and professor of physiology at Queen's College, Birmingham (a predecessor college of Birmingham University), is generally credited with the first development of dry collodion plate. In 1856, he took out a new patent for a dry plate used in photography in which the emulsion was coated with gelatine or gum arabic to preserve its sensitivity. Another method, using tannin, invented by Major C. Russell in 1861, followed and in 1864 W.E. Bolton and E.J. Sayce mixed silver bromide with collodion, so that by the mid-1860s the wet-plate process was being replaced.

== Medical ==
- Many wart-remover preparations consist of acetic acid and salicylic acid in an acetone collodion base used in the treatment of warts by keratolysis.
- Nitrocellulose (pyroxylin) solution is also used in liquid bandage products.
- EEG electrodes are commonly attached to the patient's scalp with rigid collodion for long-term treatment

== Other uses ==
- Non-flexible collodion is used in theatrical makeup for various effects. When applied to the skin, it shrinks as the solvent (usually ether or alcohol) evaporates, causing wrinkles and is used to simulate old age, or scars.
- Collodion is used in the cleaning of optics such as telescope mirrors. The collodion is applied to the surface of the optic, usually in two or more layers. Sometimes a piece of thin cloth is applied between the layers, to hold the collodion together for easy removal. After the collodion dries and forms a solid sheet covering the optic, it is carefully peeled away, taking contamination with it.
- Collodion is a pure type of pyroxylin used to embed specimens which will be examined under a microscope.
- While in Paris, René Dagron became familiar with the collodion wet plate and collodion-albumen dry plate processes which he would later adapt to his microfilm and Stanhope production techniques.
- Collodion was used by Alfred Nobel in his development of blasting gelatin, a more powerful, flexible, and water resistant variation of his already-successful dynamite.
- Some types of nail polish also contain collodion.

== See also ==
- Collodion baby
- Collodion process
