= Coddington magnifier =

The cross-section through the optical axis shows the grooves that limit the aberration.

A Coddington magnifier is a magnifying glass consisting of a single very thick lens with a central deep groove diaphragm at the equator, thus limiting the rays to those close to the axis, which minimizes spherical aberration. This allows for greater magnification than a conventional magnifying glass, typically 10× up to 20×. Most single lens magnifiers are limited to 5× or so before significant distortion occurs. The drawback is that the diaphragm groove reduces the area seen through the magnifier.

== History ==
In 1812 William Hyde Wollaston introduced a much improved version of the earliest magnifiers consisting of a spherical glass by employing two hemispheres of glass mounted together with a small stop between them. Sir David Brewster found that Wollaston's form worked best when the two lenses were hemispheres and the central space was filled up with a transparent cement having the same refractive index as the glass. He therefore used a sphere from a single piece of glass with a deep groove cut in it. In 1829, Henry Coddington brought the Wollaston–Brewster lens into general notice and further refined the design by modifying the shape of the groove, though Coddington laid no claim to being its inventor.

== See also ==
- Stanhope lens
