= Index of optics articles =

Optics is the branch of physics which involves the behavior and properties of light, including its interactions with matter and the construction of instruments that use or detect it. Optics usually describes the behavior of visible, ultraviolet, and infrared light. Because light is an electromagnetic wave, other forms of electromagnetic radiation such as X-rays, microwaves, and radio waves exhibit similar properties.

== A ==
- Abbe number
- Abbe prism
- Abbe sine condition
- Aberration in optical systems
- Absorption
- Absorption spectrum
- Acousto-optics
- Acousto-optic deflector
- Acousto-optic filter
- Acousto-optic modulator
- Active laser medium
- Afterglow
- Airglow
- Airy disk
- Albedo
- Alexander's band
- Alpenglow
- Angle of incidence
- Angle of reflection
- Angular magnification
- Anti-reflective coating
- Arago spot
- Asterism (astronomy)
- Asterism (gemmology)
- Aspheric lens
- Atmospheric diffraction
- Atom optics
- Atomic, molecular, and optical physics
- Aura (optics)
- Auroral light
- Avalanche photodiode
- Aventurescence
- Axicon

== B ==
- Barrel distortion
- Beam splitter
- Beer–Lambert law
- Binoculars
- Biophotonics
- Birefringence
- Black-body radiation
- Brewster's angle
- Brewster window
- Brightness temperature
- Brillouin scattering

== C ==
- Camera
- Camera lens
- Camera lucida
- Camera obscura
- Candela
- Cardinal point (optics)
- Cassegrain reflector
- Cathodoluminescence
- Catoptrics
- Caustic (optics)
- Chatoyancy
- Chemical laser
- Chromatic aberration
- Chromaticity
- Chromaticity diagram
- Chrominance
- Circle of confusion
- Circular dichroism
- Coherence length
- Coherence (physics)
- Coherence time
- Collimated light
- Color
- Colorimetry
- Color science
- Common-path interferometer
- Confocal
- Confocal laser scanning microscopy
- Concave lens
- Concave mirror
- Convex lens
- Convex mirror
- Cooke triplet
- Corner reflector
- Crystal optics

== D ==
- Dark state
- Densitometry
- Depolarizer (optics)
- Diaphragm (optics)
- Dichroism
- Dichroic filter
- Dichroic prism
- Dichromatic reflectance model
- Differential group delay
- Diffraction
- Diffraction grating
- Diffraction spike
- Diffractive optics
- Digital handheld refractometer
- Dispersion (optics)
- Double-Gauss lens
- Double refraction
- Double-slit experiment
- Dual polarisation interferometry

== E ==
- EDFA
- Effect of sun angle on climate
- Electro-gyration
- Electro-optic effect
- Electroluminescence
- Electromagnetic radiation
- Electromagnetic spectrum
- Electromagnetic wave
- Elve
- Emission spectrum
- Entrance pupil
- Exit pupil
- Eyeglass prescription
- Etalon
- Evanescent wave
- Excimer laser
- Eye
- Eyepiece

== F ==
- f-number
- fabrication and testing (optical components)
- Faraday effect
- far point
- fata Morgana
- Fermat's principle
- fiber amplifier
- fiber optic terms (list)
- fiber optics
- filter (optics)
- Fizeau's measurement of the speed of light in air
- Flat mirror
- fluorescence
- focal length
- focal point (optics)
- focus
- Folded optics
- Foucault's measurements of the speed of light
- Fourier optics
- Fraunhofer diffraction
- Fraunhofer line
- free-space optical communication
- Augustin-Jean Fresnel
- Fresnel equations
- Fresnel lens
- Fresnel number
- Fresnel reflection
- Fresnel zone

== G ==
- gain-switching
- Gaussian beam
- gegenschein
- geometrical optics
- Glan–Foucault prism
- Glan–laser prism
- Glan–Taylor prism
- Glan–Thompson prism
- glory (optical phenomenon)
- gloss (material appearance)
- gradient index lens
- gradient index optics
- guided-wave optics

== H ==
- Haidinger's brush
- halo (optical phenomenon)
- haze (optics)
- Helium–neon laser
- history of lensmaking
- holography
- human visual system
- Huygens' principle

== I ==
- Image processing
- Incandescence
- Index ellipsoid
- indices of refraction (list)
- Information theory
- Integrated optics
- Interference
- Interferometry
- Inverse problem in optics
- Inverse-square law
- Iridescence
- International Commission on Illumination

== J ==
- Jones calculus

== K ==
- Kerr cell
- Kerr effect
- Kerr-lens modelocking
- knife-edge effect

== L ==
- Laser
- Laser construction
- Laser applications
- Laser pumping
- Laser science
- Lasing threshold
- Least distance of distinct vision
- Lens (optics)
- lens designs (list)
- Lensmeter
- Light
- Light bulb
- Light-emitting diode
- Light meter
- Liquid-crystal display
- Liquid scintillation counting
- Luminance
- Luminiferous aether
- Luminosity
- Luminous intensity
- Lumen
- Lustre (mineralogy)
- Lux

== M ==
- magnifying glass
- material science – optical properties
- metamerism
- Michelson–Morley experiment
- microlens
- micromirror device
- microphotonics
- microscope
- Mie scattering
- mirage
- mirror
- modelocking
- modern optics
- monochromator
- monocular
- multilayer optics

== N ==
- Nanobiophotonics
- Nanophotonics
- Natural Color System
- Neuromorphic photonics
- Newton's rings
- Nicol prism
- Nomarski prism
- Nonimaging optics
- nonlinear optics
- normal lens
- numerical aperture

== O ==
- off-axis optical system
- optical aberration
- optical amplifier
- optical axis
- optical axis gratings
- optical bench
- optical coating
- optical coherence tomography
- optical communication
- optical computer
- optical data storage (science of)
- optical depth
- optical disc
- optical distance
- optical engineering
- optical fiber
- optical fiber connector
- optical illusion
- optical instrument
- optical isotropy
- optical lens design
- optical modeling and simulation
- optical path
- optical path length
- optical pattern recognition
- optical phenomenon
- optical processor
- optical resonator
- optical sine theorem
- optical spectrum
- optical theorem
- optical tweezers
- optical waveguide
- optical window
- optics
- optoelectrofluidics
- optoelectronics
- optofluidics

== P ==
- paraxial approximation
- pattern recognition
- pentaprism
- penumbra
- periscope
- phase (waves)
- phosphorescence
- phot
- photodiode
- photoelectric effect
- photographic lens
- photography (science of)
- photometry
- photomultiplier
- photon
- photonic crystal
- photonics
- photon polarization
- photorefractive effect
- photoresistor
- physical optics
- pincushion distortion
- pinhole camera
- piston (optics)
- plasmonics
- pleochroism
- Pockels effect
- polarimeter
- polarization (waves)
- Polaroid (polarizer)
- population inversion
- Porro prism
- prime lens
- principal focus
- principle of least time
- prism (optics)
- prism compressor
- progressive lenses

== Q ==
- Quasioptics
- Q-switching
- quantum optics
- quantum well laser

== R ==
- Radial polarisation
- Radiometry
- radius of curvature
- Rainbow
- Raman amplification
- Raman amplifier
- Ray (optics)
- Rayleigh criterion
- Rayleigh scattering
- Ray tracing
- Ray transfer matrix analysis
- Reflecting telescope
- Reflection (optics)
- Refracting telescope
- Refraction
- Reflection coefficient
- Refractive index
- Refractometer
- Retroreflector
- RGB color model
- Rochon prism
- Rotating-wave approximation

== S ==
- scattering
- Scheimpflug principle
- scintillator
- scintillation (astronomy)
- Sellmeier equation
- semiconductor optics
- Sénarmont prism
- shadow
- silicon photonics
- slit experiment
- Willebrord Snell
- Snell's law
- spatial filter
- speckle pattern
- speckle interferometry
- spectroscopy
- speed of light
- spontaneous emission
- sprite (optical phenomenon)
- statistical optics
- stereoscopy
- stimulated emission
- Stokes parameters
- sun dog
- sunlight
- sylvanshine
- synchrotron radiation

== T ==
- telescope
- thermal physics - radiative heat transfer
- thin-film optics
- tilt (optics)
- total internal reflection
- transparency (optics)
- transverse mode
- triangular prism
- Tyndall effect

== U ==
- ultraviolet catastrophe
- umbra
- Umov effect

== W ==
- wave articles (index)
- waveguide
- wavelength
- wavelength division multiplexing
- wave plate
- wide-angle lens
- Wollaston prism

== Z ==
- Zeeman effect
- Zeiss Tessar
- zodiacal light
- zone plate
- zoom lens

== See also ==
- Category:Optical components
- Category:Optical materials
