= Optics =

Branch of physics that studies light

Optics is the branch of physics that studies the behaviour, manipulation, and detection of electromagnetic radiation, including its interactions with matter and instruments that use or detect it. Optics usually describes the behaviour of visible, ultraviolet, and infrared light. The study of optics extends to other forms of electromagnetic radiation, including radio waves, microwaves, and X-rays. The term optics is also applied to technology for manipulating beams of elementary charged particles.

Most of the discipline of optics falls into 3 main categories. Geometric optics treats light as a collection of rays that travel in straight lines and bend when they pass through or reflect from surfaces. Physical optics includes wave effects such as diffraction and interference that cannot be accounted for in geometric optics. Finally, quantum optics deals with the application of quantum mechanics to optical systems. These phenomena depend on light having both wave-like and particle-like properties. Too, the direction in which light waves wave, its polarization, is important for some uses and devices.

Historically, optical instruments were designed and used long before the physics underlying them were understood. The ray-based, geometrical optics, was developed first, followed by the wave based, physical optics, model of light. Progress in electromagnetic theory in the 19th century led to the discovery that light waves are electromagnetic radiation. Finally, the early 20th century saw the advent of quantum optics which correctly modeled light emitted by hot objects and how light interacts with matter.

Optical science is relevant to and studied in many related disciplines including astronomy, various engineering fields, photography, and medicine, especially in radiographic methods such as beam radiation therapy and CT scans, and in the physiological optical fields of ophthalmology and optometry. Practical applications of optics are found in a variety of technologies and everyday objects, including mirrors, lenses, telescopes, microscopes, lasers, and fibre optics. Often, these elements are often rotationally symmetric; freeform optics have no such symmetry.

== Geometrical optics ==
Geometry of reflection and refraction of light rays

Geometrical optics, or ray optics, describes the propagation of light in terms of "rays" which travel in straight lines, and whose paths are governed by the laws of reflection and refraction at interfaces between different media. These laws were discovered empirically as far back as 984 AD and have been used in the design of optical components and instruments from then until the present day. They can be summarised as follows:

When a ray of light hits the boundary between two transparent materials, it is divided into a reflected and a refracted ray.

- The law of reflection says that the reflected ray lies in the plane of incidence, and the angle of reflection equals the angle of incidence.
- The law of refraction says that the refracted ray lies in the plane of incidence, and the sine of the angle of incidence divided by the sine of the angle of refraction is a constant:
  $$\frac {\sin {\theta_1}}{\sin {\theta_2}} = n,$$
  where n is a constant for any two materials and a given wavelength of light. If the first material is air or vacuum, n is the refractive index of the second material.

The laws of reflection and refraction can be derived from Fermat's principle which states that the path taken between two points by a ray of light is the path that can be traversed in the least time.

=== Approximations ===
Geometric optics is often simplified by making the paraxial approximation, or "small angle approximation". The mathematical behaviour then becomes linear, allowing optical components and systems to be described by simple matrices. This leads to the techniques of Gaussian optics and paraxial ray tracing, which are used to find basic properties of optical systems, such as approximate image and object positions and magnifications.

=== Reflections ===
Diagram of specular reflection

Reflections can be divided into two types: specular reflection and diffuse reflection. Specular reflection describes the gloss of surfaces such as mirrors, which reflect light in a simple, predictable way. This allows for the production of reflected images that can be associated with an actual (real) or extrapolated (virtual) location in space. Diffuse reflection describes non-glossy materials, such as paper or rock. The reflections from these surfaces can only be described statistically, with the exact distribution of the reflected light depending on the microscopic structure of the material. Many diffuse reflectors are described or can be approximated by Lambert's cosine law, which describes surfaces that have equal luminance when viewed from any angle. Glossy surfaces can give both specular and diffuse reflection.

In specular reflection, the direction of the reflected ray is determined by the angle the incident ray makes with the surface normal, a line perpendicular to the surface at the point where the ray hits. The incident and reflected rays and the normal lie in a single plane, and the angle between the reflected ray and the surface normal is the same as that between the incident ray and the normal. This is known as the Law of Reflection.

For flat mirrors, the law of reflection implies that images of objects are upright and the same distance behind the mirror as the objects are in front of the mirror. The image size is the same as the object size. The law also implies that mirror images are parity inverted, which we perceive as a left-right inversion. Images formed from reflection in two (or any even number of) mirrors are not parity inverted. Corner reflectors produce reflected rays that travel back in the direction from which the incident rays came. This is called retroreflection.

Mirrors with curved surfaces can be modelled by ray tracing and using the law of reflection at each point on the surface. For mirrors with parabolic surfaces, parallel rays incident on the mirror produce reflected rays that converge at a common focus. Other curved surfaces may also focus light, but with aberrations due to the diverging shape causing the focus to be smeared out in space. In particular, spherical mirrors exhibit spherical aberration. Curved mirrors can form images with a magnification greater than or less than one, and the magnification can be negative, indicating that the image is inverted. An upright image formed by reflection in a mirror is always virtual, while an inverted image is real and can be projected onto a screen.

=== Refractions ===
Illustration of Snell's Law for the case n_{1} < n_{2}, such as air/water interface

Refraction occurs when light travels through an area of space that has a changing index of refraction; this principle allows for lenses and the focusing of light. The simplest case of refraction occurs when there is an interface between a uniform medium with index of refraction n_{1} and another medium with index of refraction n_{2}. In such situations, Snell's Law describes the resulting deflection of the light ray:

$$n_1\sin\theta_1 = n_2\sin\theta_2$$

where θ_{1} and θ_{2} are the angles between the normal (to the interface) and the incident and refracted waves, respectively.

The index of refraction of a medium is related to the speed, v, of light in that medium by
$$n=c/v,$$
where c is the speed of light in vacuum.

Snell's Law can be used to predict the deflection of light rays as they pass through linear media as long as the indexes of refraction and the geometry of the media are known. For example, the propagation of light through a prism results in the light ray being deflected depending on the shape and orientation of the prism. In most materials, the index of refraction varies with the frequency of the light, known as dispersion. Taking this into account, Snell's Law can be used to predict how a prism will disperse light into a spectrum. The discovery of this phenomenon when passing light through a prism is famously attributed to Isaac Newton.

Some media have an index of refraction which varies gradually with position and, therefore, light rays in the medium are curved. This effect is responsible for mirages seen on hot days: a change in index of refraction air with height causes light rays to bend, creating the appearance of specular reflections in the distance (as if on the surface of a pool of water). Optical materials with varying indexes of refraction are called gradient-index (GRIN) materials. Such materials are used to make gradient-index optics.

For light rays travelling from a material with a high index of refraction to a material with a low index of refraction, Snell's law predicts that there is no θ_{2} when θ_{1} is large. In this case, no transmission occurs; all the light is reflected. This phenomenon is called total internal reflection and allows for fibre optics technology. As light travels down an optical fibre, it undergoes total internal reflection allowing for essentially no light to be lost over the length of the cable.

==== Lenses ====
A ray tracing diagram for a converging lens

A device that produces converging or diverging light rays due to refraction is known as a lens. Lenses are characterized by their focal length: a converging lens has positive focal length, while a diverging lens has negative focal length. Smaller focal length indicates that the lens has a stronger converging or diverging effect. The focal length of a simple lens in air is given by the lensmaker's equation.

Ray tracing can be used to show how images are formed by a lens. For a thin lens in air, the location of the image is given by the simple equation

$$\frac{1}{S_1} + \frac{1}{S_2} = \frac{1}{f} ,$$

where S_{1} is the distance from the object to the lens, S_{2} is the distance from the lens to the image, and f is the focal length of the lens. In the sign convention used here, the object and image distances are positive if the object and image are on opposite sides of the lens.

Incoming parallel rays are focused by a converging lens onto a spot one focal length from the lens, on the far side of the lens. This is called the rear focal point of the lens. Rays from an object at a finite distance are focused further from the lens than the focal distance; the closer the object is to the lens, the further the image is from the lens.

With diverging lenses, incoming parallel rays diverge after going through the lens, in such a way that they seem to have originated at a spot one focal length in front of the lens. This is the lens's front focal point. Rays from an object at a finite distance are associated with a virtual image that is closer to the lens than the focal point, and on the same side of the lens as the object. The closer the object is to the lens, the closer the virtual image is to the lens. As with mirrors, upright images produced by a single lens are virtual, while inverted images are real.

Lenses suffer from aberrations that distort images. Monochromatic aberrations occur because the geometry of the lens does not perfectly direct rays from each object point to a single point on the image, while chromatic aberration occurs because the index of refraction of the lens varies with the wavelength of the light.

Images of black letters in a thin convex lens of focal length f are shown in red. Selected rays are shown for letters E, I and K in blue, green and orange, respectively. Note that E (at 2f) has an equal-size, real and inverted image; I (at f) has its image at infinity; and K (at f/2) has a double-size, virtual and upright image.

== Physical optics ==
In physical optics, light is considered to propagate as waves. This model predicts phenomena such as interference and diffraction, which are not explained by geometric optics. The speed of light waves in air is approximately 3.0×10^{8} m/s (exactly 299,792,458 m/s in vacuum). The wavelength of visible light waves varies between 400 and 700 nm, but the term "light" is also often applied to infrared (0.7–300 μm) and ultraviolet radiation (10–400 nm).

The wave model can be used to make predictions about how an optical system will behave without requiring an explanation of what is "waving" in what medium. Until the middle of the 19th century, most physicists believed in an "ethereal" medium in which the light disturbance propagated. The existence of electromagnetic waves was predicted in 1865 by Maxwell's equations. These waves propagate at the speed of light and have varying electric and magnetic fields which are orthogonal to one another, and also to the direction of propagation of the waves. Light waves are now generally treated as electromagnetic waves except when quantum mechanical effects have to be considered.

=== Modelling and design of optical systems using physical optics ===
Many simplified approximations are available for analysing and designing optical systems. Most of these use a single scalar quantity to represent the electric field of the light wave, rather than using a vector model with orthogonal electric and magnetic vectors. The Huygens–Fresnel equation is one such model. This was derived empirically by Fresnel in 1815, based on Huygens' hypothesis that each point on a wavefront generates a secondary spherical wavefront, which Fresnel combined with the principle of superposition of waves. The Kirchhoff diffraction equation, which is derived using Maxwell's equations, puts the Huygens-Fresnel equation on a firmer physical foundation. Examples of the application of Huygens–Fresnel principle can be found in the articles on diffraction and Fraunhofer diffraction.

More rigorous models, involving the modelling of both electric and magnetic fields of the light wave, are required when dealing with materials whose electric and magnetic properties affect the interaction of light with the material. For instance, the behaviour of a light wave interacting with a metal surface is quite different from what happens when it interacts with a dielectric material. A vector model must also be used to model polarised light.

Numerical modeling techniques such as the finite element method, the boundary element method and the transmission-line matrix method can be used to model the propagation of light in systems which cannot be solved analytically. Such models are computationally demanding and are normally only used to solve small-scale problems that require accuracy beyond that which can be achieved with analytical solutions.

All of the results from geometrical optics can be recovered using the techniques of Fourier optics which apply many of the same mathematical and analytical techniques used in acoustic engineering and signal processing.

Gaussian beam propagation is a simple paraxial physical optics model for the propagation of coherent radiation such as laser beams. This technique partially accounts for diffraction, allowing accurate calculations of the rate at which a laser beam expands with distance, and the minimum size to which the beam can be focused. Gaussian beam propagation thus bridges the gap between geometric and physical optics.

=== Superposition and interference ===
In the absence of nonlinear effects, the superposition principle can be used to predict the shape of interacting waveforms through the simple addition of the disturbances. This interaction of waves to produce a resulting pattern is generally termed "interference" and can result in a variety of outcomes. If two waves of the same wavelength and frequency are in phase, both the wave crests and wave troughs align. This results in constructive interference and an increase in the amplitude of the wave, which for light is associated with a brightening of the waveform in that location. Alternatively, if the two waves of the same wavelength and frequency are out of phase, then the wave crests will align with wave troughs and vice versa. This results in destructive interference and a decrease in the amplitude of the wave, which for light is associated with a dimming of the waveform at that location. See below for an illustration of this effect.

combined waveform
wave 1
wave 2
	Two waves in phase	Two waves 180° out of phase

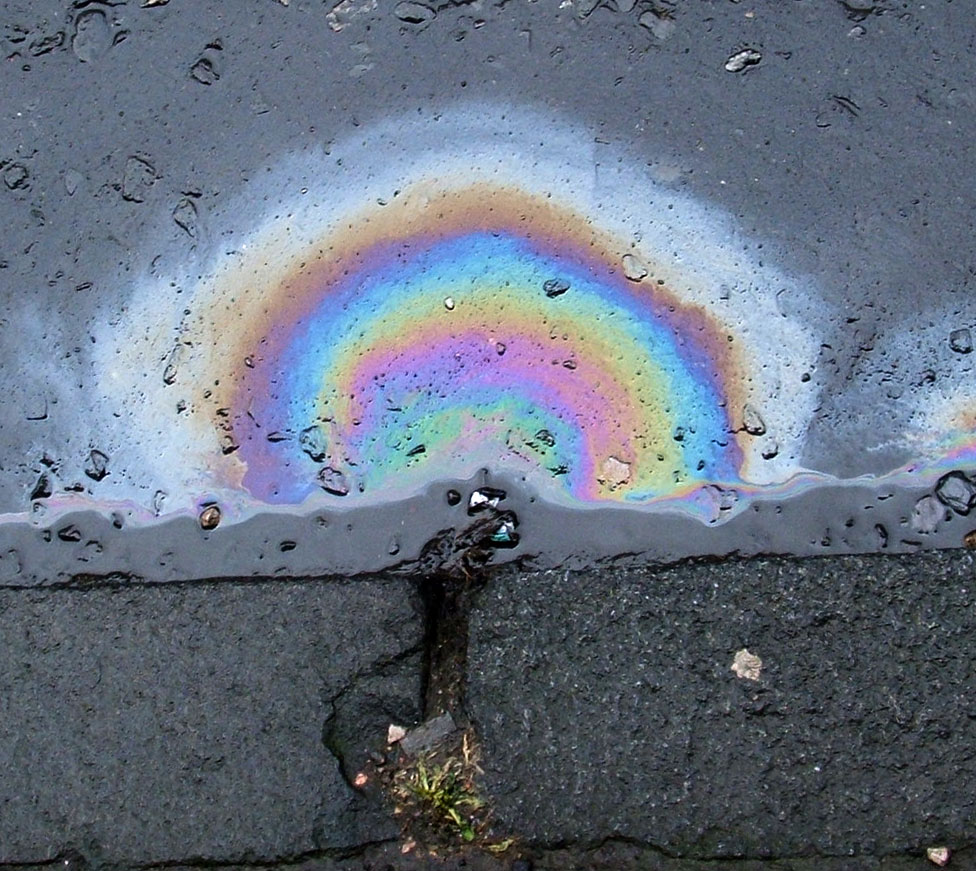
When oil or fuel is spilled, colourful patterns are formed by thin-film interference.

Since the Huygens–Fresnel principle states that every point of a wavefront is associated with the production of a new disturbance, it is possible for a wavefront to interfere with itself constructively or destructively at different locations producing bright and dark fringes in regular and predictable patterns. Interferometry is the science of measuring these patterns, usually as a means of making precise determinations of distances or angular resolutions. The Michelson interferometer was a famous instrument which used interference effects to accurately measure the speed of light.

The appearance of thin films and coatings is directly affected by interference effects. Antireflective coatings use destructive interference to reduce the reflectivity of the surfaces they coat, and can be used to minimise glare and unwanted reflections. The simplest case is a single layer with a thickness of one-fourth the wavelength of incident light. The reflected wave from the top of the film and the reflected wave from the film/material interface are then exactly 180° out of phase, causing destructive interference. The waves are only exactly out of phase for one wavelength, which would typically be chosen to be near the centre of the visible spectrum, around 550 nm. More complex designs using multiple layers can achieve low reflectivity over a broad band, or extremely low reflectivity at a single wavelength.

Constructive interference in thin films can create a strong reflection of light in a range of wavelengths, which can be narrow or broad depending on the design of the coating. These films are used to make dielectric mirrors, interference filters, heat reflectors, and filters for colour separation in colour television cameras. This interference effect is also what causes the colourful rainbow patterns seen in oil slicks.

=== Diffraction and optical resolution ===
Diffraction on two slits separated by distance d. The bright fringes occur along lines where black lines intersect with black lines and white lines intersect with white lines. These fringes are separated by angle θ and are numbered as order n.

Diffraction is the process by which light interference is most commonly observed. The effect was first described in 1665 by Francesco Maria Grimaldi, who also coined the term from the Latin diffringere 'to break into pieces'. Later that century, Robert Hooke and Isaac Newton also described phenomena now known to be diffraction in Newton's rings while James Gregory recorded his observations of diffraction patterns from bird feathers.

The first physical optics model of diffraction that relied on the Huygens–Fresnel principle was developed in 1803 by Thomas Young in his interference experiments with the interference patterns of two closely spaced slits. Young showed that his results could only be explained if the two slits acted as two unique sources of waves rather than corpuscles. In 1815 and 1818, Augustin-Jean Fresnel firmly established the mathematics of how wave interference can account for diffraction.

The simplest physical models of diffraction use equations that describe the angular separation of light and dark fringes due to light of a particular wavelength (λ). In general, the equation takes the form
$$m \lambda = d \sin \theta$$
where d is the separation between two wavefront sources (in the case of Young's experiments, it was two slits), θ is the angular separation between the central fringe and the m-th order fringe, where the central maximum is m = 0.

This equation is modified slightly to take into account a variety of situations such as diffraction through a single gap, diffraction through multiple slits, or diffraction through a diffraction grating that contains a large number of slits at equal spacing. More complicated models of diffraction require working with the mathematics of Fresnel or Fraunhofer diffraction.

X-ray diffraction makes use of the fact that atoms in a crystal have regular spacing at distances that are on the order of one angstrom. To see diffraction patterns, x-rays with similar wavelengths to that spacing are passed through the crystal. Since crystals are three-dimensional objects rather than two-dimensional gratings, the associated diffraction pattern varies in two directions according to Bragg reflection, with the associated bright spots occurring in unique patterns and d being twice the spacing between atoms.

Diffraction effects limit the ability of an optical detector to optically resolve separate light sources. In general, light that is passing through an aperture will experience diffraction and the best images that can be created (as described in diffraction-limited optics) appear as a central spot with surrounding bright rings, separated by dark nulls; this pattern is known as an Airy pattern, and the central bright lobe as an Airy disk. The size of such a disk is given by
$$\sin \theta = 1.22 \frac{\lambda}{D}$$
where θ is the angular resolution, λ is the wavelength of the light, and D is the diameter of the lens aperture. If the angular separation of the two points is significantly less than the Airy disk angular radius, then the two points cannot be resolved in the image, but if their angular separation is much greater than this, distinct images of the two points are formed and they can therefore be resolved. Rayleigh defined the somewhat arbitrary "Rayleigh criterion" that two points whose angular separation is equal to the Airy disk radius (measured to first null, that is, to the first place where no light is seen) can be considered to be resolved. It can be seen that the greater the diameter of the lens or its aperture, the finer the resolution. Interferometry, with its ability to mimic extremely large baseline apertures, allows for the greatest angular resolution possible.

For astronomical imaging, the atmosphere prevents optimal resolution from being achieved in the visible spectrum due to the atmospheric scattering and dispersion which cause stars to twinkle. Astronomers refer to this effect as the quality of astronomical seeing. Techniques known as adaptive optics have been used to eliminate the atmospheric disruption of images and achieve results that approach the diffraction limit.

=== Dispersion and scattering ===
Conceptual animation of light dispersion through a prism. High frequency (blue) light is deflected the most, and low frequency (red) the least.

Refractive processes take place in the physical optics limit, where the wavelength of light is similar to other distances, as a kind of scattering. The simplest type of scattering is Thomson scattering which occurs when electromagnetic waves are deflected by single particles. In the limit of Thomson scattering, in which the wavelike nature of light is evident, light is dispersed independent of the frequency, in contrast to Compton scattering which is frequency-dependent and strictly a quantum mechanical process, involving the nature of light as particles. In a statistical sense, elastic scattering of light by numerous particles much smaller than the wavelength of the light is a process known as Rayleigh scattering while the similar process for scattering by particles that are similar or larger in wavelength is known as Mie scattering with the Tyndall effect being a commonly observed result. A small proportion of light scattering from atoms or molecules may undergo Raman scattering, wherein the frequency changes due to excitation of the atoms and molecules. Brillouin scattering occurs when the frequency of light changes due to local changes with time and movements of a dense material.

Dispersion occurs when different frequencies of light have different phase velocities, due either to material properties (material dispersion) or to the geometry of an optical waveguide (waveguide dispersion). The most familiar form of dispersion is a decrease in index of refraction with increasing wavelength, which is seen in most transparent materials. This is called "normal dispersion". It occurs in all dielectric materials, in wavelength ranges where the material does not absorb light. In wavelength ranges where a medium has significant absorption, the index of refraction can increase with wavelength. This is called "anomalous dispersion".

The separation of colours by a prism is an example of normal dispersion. At the surfaces of the prism, Snell's law predicts that light incident at an angle θ to the normal will be refracted at an angle arcsin(sin (θ) / n). Thus, blue light, with its higher refractive index, is bent more strongly than red light, resulting in the well-known rainbow pattern.

Dispersion: two sinusoids propagating at different speeds make a moving interference pattern. The red dot moves with the phase velocity, and the green dots propagate with the group velocity. In this case, the phase velocity is twice the group velocity. The red dot overtakes two green dots, when moving from the left to the right of the figure. In effect, the individual waves (which travel with the phase velocity) escape from the wave packet (which travels with the group velocity).

Material dispersion is often characterised by the Abbe number, which gives a simple measure of dispersion based on the index of refraction at three specific wavelengths. Waveguide dispersion is dependent on the propagation constant. Both kinds of dispersion cause changes in the group characteristics of the wave, the features of the wave packet that change with the same frequency as the amplitude of the electromagnetic wave. "Group velocity dispersion" manifests as a spreading-out of the signal "envelope" of the radiation and can be quantified with a group dispersion delay parameter:

$$D = \frac{1}{v_\mathrm{g}^2} \frac{dv_\mathrm{g}}{d\lambda}$$

where v_{g} is the group velocity. For a uniform medium, the group velocity is

$$v_\mathrm{g} = c \left( n - \lambda \frac{dn}{d\lambda} \right)^{-1}$$

where n is the index of refraction and c is the speed of light in a vacuum. This gives a simpler form for the dispersion delay parameter:

$$D = - \frac{\lambda}{c} \, \frac{d^2 n}{d \lambda^2}.$$

If D is less than zero, the medium is said to have positive dispersion or normal dispersion. If D is greater than zero, the medium has negative dispersion. If a light pulse is propagated through a normally dispersive medium, the result is the higher frequency components slow down more than the lower frequency components. The pulse therefore becomes positively chirped, or up-chirped, increasing in frequency with time. This causes the spectrum coming out of a prism to appear with red light the least refracted and blue/violet light the most refracted. Conversely, if a pulse travels through an anomalously (negatively) dispersive medium, high-frequency components travel faster than the lower ones, and the pulse becomes negatively chirped, or down-chirped, decreasing in frequency with time.

The result of group velocity dispersion, whether negative or positive, is ultimately temporal spreading of the pulse. This makes dispersion management extremely important in optical communications systems based on optical fibres, since if dispersion is too high, a group of pulses representing information will each spread in time and merge, making it impossible to extract the signal.

== Polarisation ==
Polarisation is a general property of waves that describes the orientation of their oscillations. For transverse waves such as many electromagnetic waves, it describes the orientation of the oscillations in the plane perpendicular to the wave's direction of travel. The oscillations may be oriented in a single direction (linear polarisation), or the oscillation direction may rotate as the wave travels (circular or elliptical polarisation). Circularly polarised waves can rotate rightward or leftward in the direction of travel, and which of those two rotations is present in a wave is called the wave's chirality.

The typical way to consider polarisation is to keep track of the orientation of the electric field vector as the electromagnetic wave propagates. The electric field vector of a plane wave may be arbitrarily divided into two perpendicular components labeled x and y (with z indicating the direction of travel). The shape traced out in the x-y plane by the electric field vector is a Lissajous figure that describes the polarisation state. The following figures show some examples of the evolution of the electric field vector (blue), with time (the vertical axes), at a particular point in space, along with its x and y components (red/left and green/right), and the path traced by the vector in the plane (purple): The same evolution would occur when looking at the electric field at a particular time while evolving the point in space, along the direction opposite to propagation.

Linear polarisation diagram

Linear

Circular polarisation diagram

Circular

Elliptical polarisation diagram

Elliptical polarisation

In the leftmost figure above, the x and y components of the light wave are in phase. In this case, the ratio of their strengths is constant, so the direction of the electric vector (the vector sum of these two components) is constant. Since the tip of the vector traces out a single line in the plane, this special case is called linear polarisation. The direction of this line depends on the relative amplitudes of the two components.

In the middle figure, the two orthogonal components have the same amplitudes and are 90° out of phase. In this case, one component is zero when the other component is at maximum or minimum amplitude. There are two possible phase relationships that satisfy this requirement: the x component can be 90° ahead of the y component or it can be 90° behind the y component. In this special case, the electric vector traces out a circle in the plane, so this polarisation is called circular polarisation. The rotation direction in the circle depends on which of the two-phase relationships exists and corresponds to right-hand circular polarisation and left-hand circular polarisation.

In all other cases, where the two components either do not have the same amplitudes and/or their phase difference is neither zero nor a multiple of 90°, the polarisation is called elliptical polarisation because the electric vector traces out an ellipse in the plane (the polarisation ellipse). This is shown in the above figure on the right. Detailed mathematics of polarisation is done using Jones calculus and is characterised by the Stokes parameters.

=== Changing polarisation ===
Media that have different indexes of refraction for different polarisation modes are called birefringent. Well known manifestations of this effect appear in optical wave plates/retarders (linear modes) and in Faraday rotation/optical rotation (circular modes). If the path length in the birefringent medium is sufficient, plane waves will exit the material with a significantly different propagation direction, due to refraction. For example, this is the case with macroscopic crystals of calcite, which present the viewer with two offset, orthogonally polarised images of whatever is viewed through them. It was this effect that provided the first discovery of polarisation, by Erasmus Bartholinus in 1669. In addition, the phase shift, and thus the change in polarisation state, is usually frequency dependent, which, in combination with dichroism, often gives rise to bright colours and rainbow-like effects. In mineralogy, such properties, known as pleochroism, are frequently exploited for the purpose of identifying minerals using polarisation microscopes. Additionally, many plastics that are not normally birefringent will become so when subject to mechanical stress, a phenomenon which is the basis of photoelasticity. Non-birefringent methods, to rotate the linear polarisation of light beams, include the use of prismatic polarisation rotators which use total internal reflection in a prism set designed for efficient collinear transmission.

A polariser changing the orientation of linearly polarised light. In this picture, θ_{1} – θ_{0} = θ_{i}.

Media that reduce the amplitude of certain polarisation modes are called dichroic, with devices that block nearly all of the radiation in one mode known as polarising filters or simply "polarisers". Malus' law, which is named after Étienne-Louis Malus, says that when a perfect polariser is placed in a linear polarised beam of light, the intensity, I, of the light that passes through is given by

$$I = I_0 \cos^2 \theta_\mathrm{i} ,$$
where I_{0} is the initial intensity, and θ_{i} is the angle between the light's initial polarisation direction and the axis of the polariser.

A beam of unpolarised light can be thought of as containing a uniform mixture of linear polarisations at all possible angles. Since the average value of cos^{2} θ is 1/2, the transmission coefficient becomes

$$\frac {I}{I_0} = \frac {1}{2}\,.$$

In practice, some light is lost in the polariser and the actual transmission of unpolarised light will be somewhat lower than this, around 38% for Polaroid-type polarisers but considerably higher (>49.9%) for some birefringent prism types.

In addition to birefringence and dichroism in extended media, polarisation effects can also occur at the (reflective) interface between two materials of different refractive index. These effects are treated by the Fresnel equations. Part of the wave is transmitted and part is reflected, with the ratio depending on the angle of incidence and the angle of refraction. In this way, physical optics recovers Brewster's angle. When light reflects from a thin film on a surface, interference between the reflections from the film's surfaces can produce polarisation in the reflected and transmitted light.

=== Natural light ===
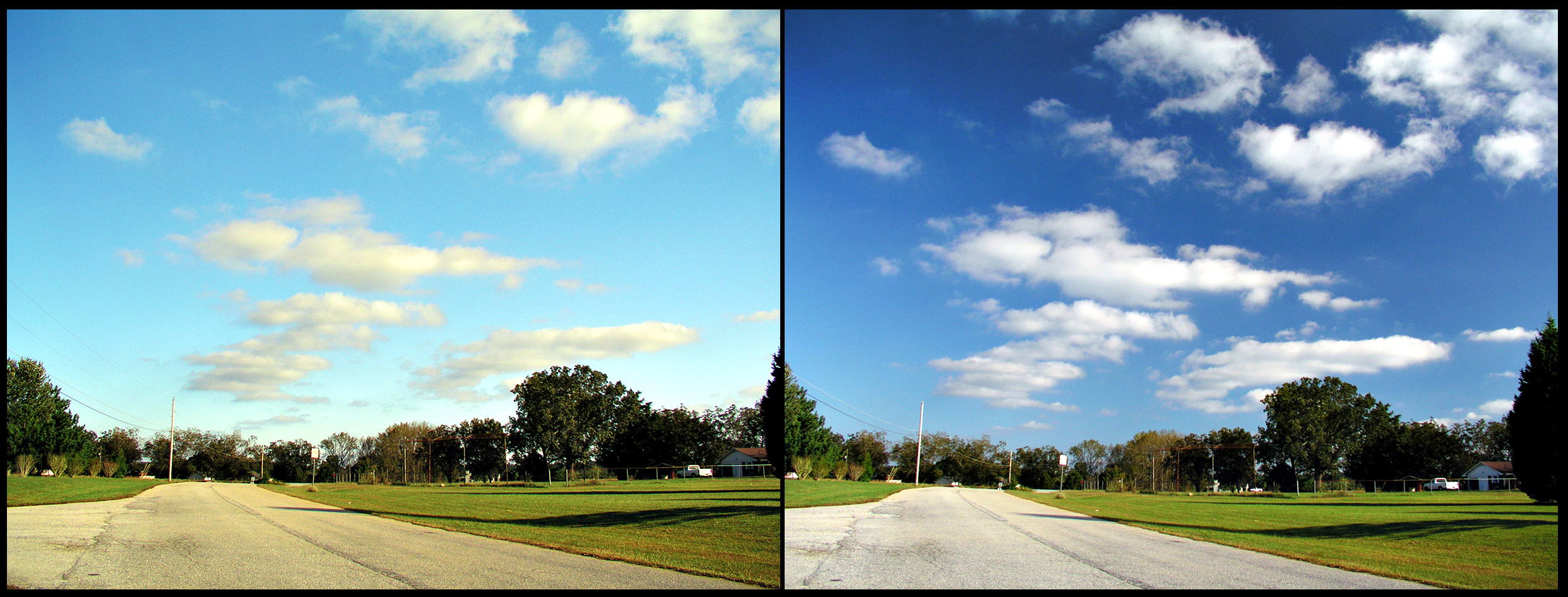
The effects of a polarising filter on the sky in a photograph. Left picture is taken without polariser. For the right picture, filter was adjusted to eliminate certain polarisations of the scattered blue light from the sky.

Most sources of electromagnetic radiation contain a large number of atoms or molecules that emit light. The orientation of the electric fields produced by these emitters may not be correlated, in which case the light is said to be unpolarised. If there is partial correlation between the emitters, the light is partially polarised. If the polarisation is consistent across the spectrum of the source, partially polarised light can be described as a superposition of a completely unpolarised component, and a completely polarised one. One may then describe the light in terms of the degree of polarisation, and the parameters of the polarisation ellipse.

Light reflected by shiny transparent materials is partly or fully polarised, except when the light is normal (perpendicular) to the surface. It was this effect that allowed the mathematician Étienne-Louis Malus to make the measurements that allowed for his development of the first mathematical models for polarised light. Polarisation occurs when light is scattered in the atmosphere. The scattered light produces the brightness and colour in clear skies. This partial polarisation of scattered light can be taken advantage of using polarising filters to darken the sky in photographs. Optical polarisation is principally of importance in chemistry due to circular dichroism and optical rotation (circular birefringence) exhibited by optically active (chiral) molecules.

== Quantum Optics ==
Quantum optics deals with specifically quantum mechanical properties of light. It is not just theoretical; some modern devices, such as lasers, have principles of operation that depend on quantum mechanics. Light detectors, such as photomultipliers and channeltrons, respond to individual photons. Electronic image sensors, such as CCDs, exhibit shot noise corresponding to the statistics of individual photon events. Light-emitting diodes and photovoltaic cells, too, cannot be understood without quantum mechanics. In the study of these devices, quantum optics often overlaps with quantum electronics.

== Modern optics ==
Modern optics encompasses the areas of optical science and engineering that became popular in the 20th century. These areas of optical science typically relate to the electromagnetic or quantum properties of light but do include other topics.

Specialty areas of optics research include the study of how light interacts with specific materials as in crystal optics and metamaterials. Other research focuses on the phenomenology of electromagnetic waves as in singular optics, non-imaging optics, non-linear optics, statistical optics, and radiometry. Additionally, computer engineers have taken an interest in integrated optics, machine vision, and photonic computing as possible components of the "next generation" of computers.

Today, the pure science of optics is called optical science or optical physics to distinguish it from applied optical sciences, which are referred to as optical engineering. Prominent subfields of optical engineering include illumination engineering, photonics, and optoelectronics with practical applications like lens design, fabrication and testing of optical components, and image processing. Some of these fields overlap, with nebulous boundaries between the subjects' terms that mean slightly different things in different parts of the world and in different areas of industry. A professional community of researchers in nonlinear optics has developed in the last several decades due to advances in laser technology.

=== Lasers ===
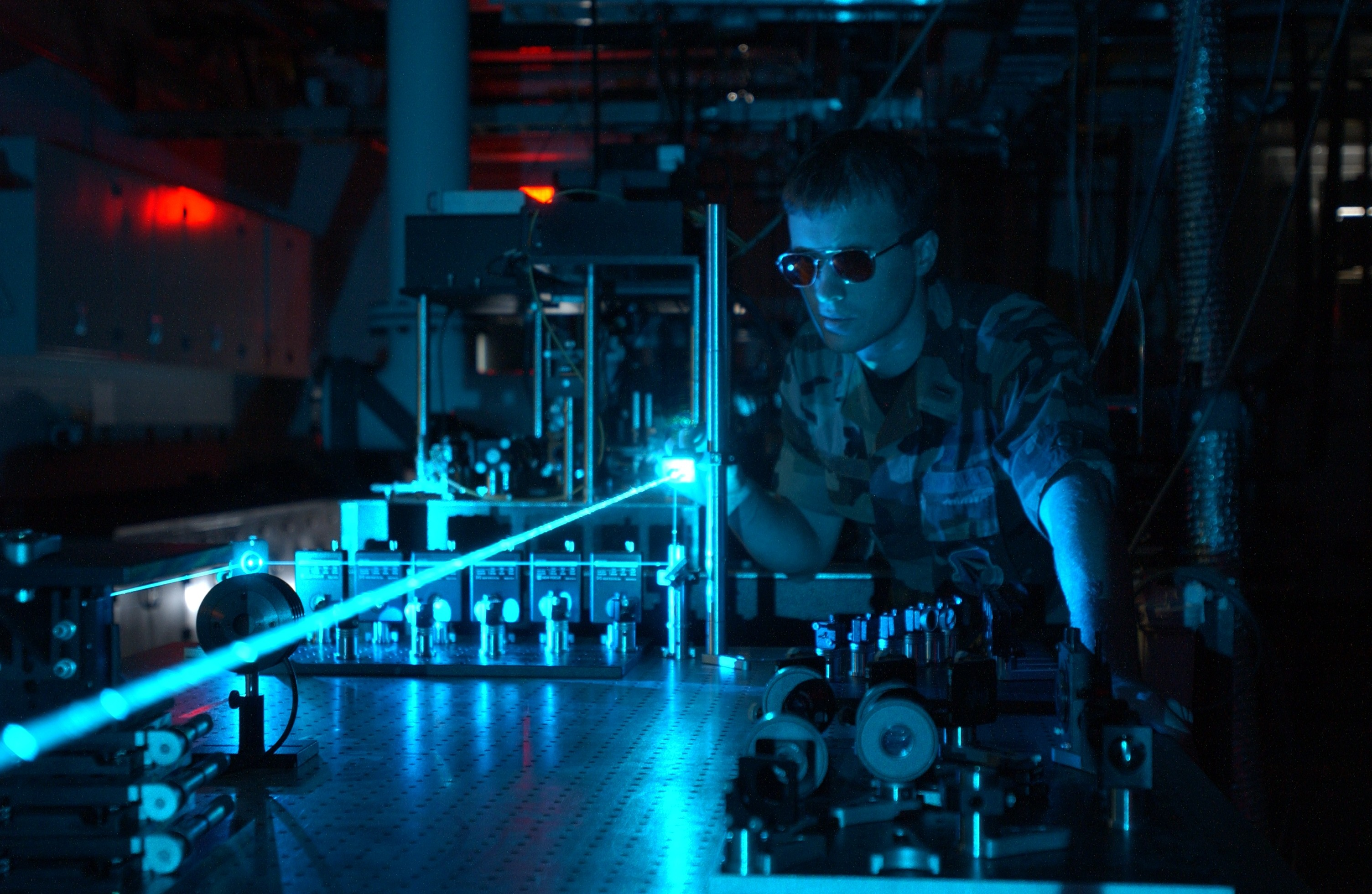
Experiments such as this one with high-power lasers are part of the modern optics research.

A laser is a device that emits light, a kind of electromagnetic radiation, through a process called stimulated emission. The term laser is an acronym for 'Light Amplification by Stimulated Emission of Radiation'. Laser light is usually spatially coherent, which means that the light either is emitted in a narrow, low-divergence beam, or can be converted into one with the help of optical components such as lenses. Because the microwave equivalent of the laser, the maser, was developed first, devices that emit microwave and radio frequencies are usually called masers.

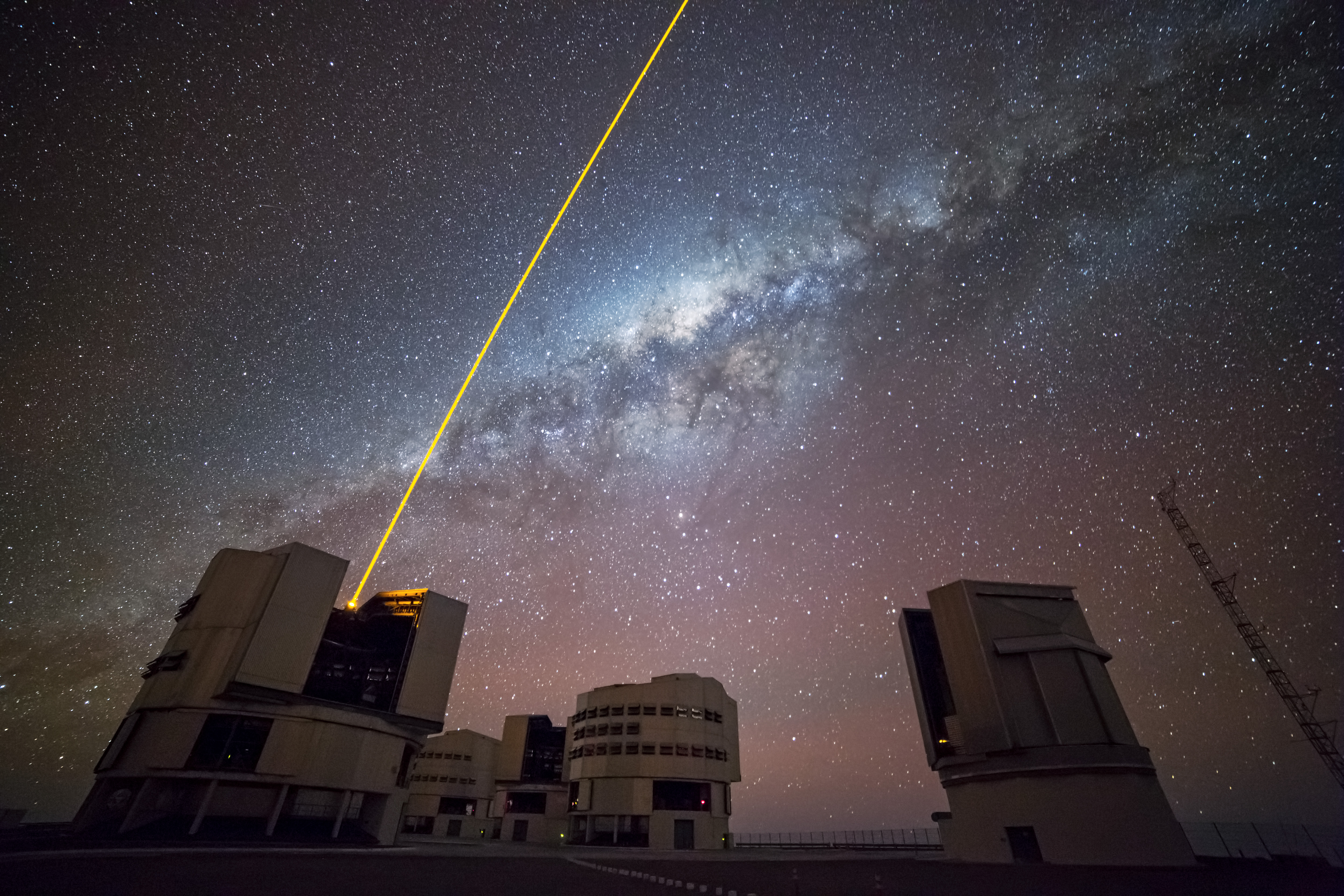
VLT's laser guide star

The first working laser was demonstrated on 16 May 1960 by Theodore Maiman at Hughes Research Laboratories. When first invented, they were called "a solution looking for a problem". Since then, lasers have become a multibillion-dollar industry, finding utility in thousands of highly varied applications. The first application of lasers visible in the daily lives of the general population was the supermarket barcode scanner, introduced in 1974. The LaserDisc player, introduced in 1978, was the first successful consumer product to include a laser, but the compact disc player was the first laser-equipped device to become truly common in consumers' homes, beginning in 1982. These optical storage devices use a semiconductor laser less than a millimetre wide to scan the surface of the disc for data retrieval. Fibre-optic communication relies on lasers to transmit large amounts of information at the speed of light. Other common applications of lasers include laser printers and laser pointers. Lasers are used in medicine in areas such as bloodless surgery, laser eye surgery, and laser capture microdissection and in military applications such as missile defence systems, electro-optical countermeasures (EOCM), and lidar. Lasers are also used in holograms, bubblegrams, laser light shows, and laser hair removal.

=== Kapitsa–Dirac effect ===
The Kapitsa–Dirac effect causes beams of particles to diffract as the result of meeting a standing wave of light. Light can be used to position matter using various phenomena (see optical tweezers).

== Applications ==
Optics is part of everyday life. The ubiquity of visual systems in biology indicates the central role optics plays as the science of one of the five senses. Many people benefit from eyeglasses or contact lenses, and optics are integral to the functioning of many consumer goods including cameras. Rainbows and mirages are examples of optical phenomena. Optical communication provides the backbone for both the Internet and modern telephony.

=== Human eye ===
Model of a human eye. Features mentioned in this article are 1. vitreous humour 3. ciliary muscle, 6. pupil, 7. anterior chamber, 8. cornea, 10. lens cortex, 22. optic nerve, 26. fovea, 30. retina.

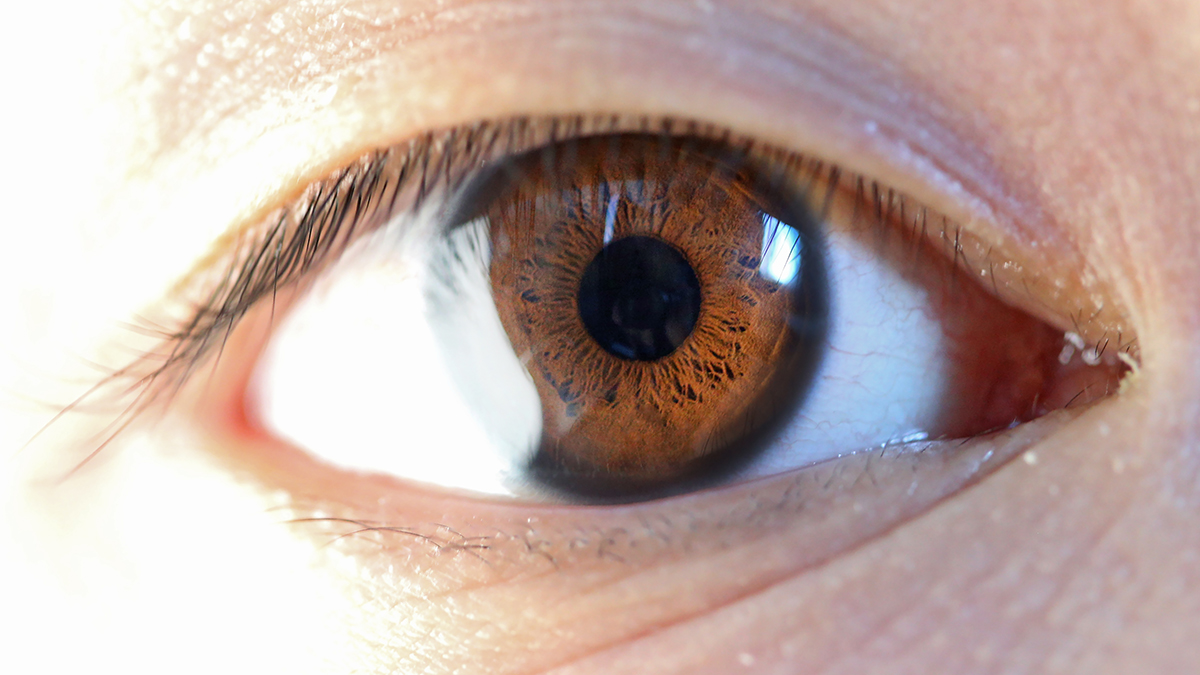
The human eye is a living optical device. The iris (light brown region), pupil (black circle in the centre), and sclera (white surrounding area) are visible in this image, along with the eyelids and eyelashes which protect the eye

The human eye functions by focusing light onto a layer of photoreceptor cells called the retina, which forms the inner lining of the back of the eye. The focusing is accomplished by a series of transparent media. Light entering the eye passes first through the cornea, which provides much of the eye's optical power. The light then continues through the fluid just behind the cornea—the anterior chamber, then passes through the pupil. The light then passes through the lens, which focuses the light further and allows adjustment of focus. The light then passes through the main body of fluid in the eye—the vitreous humour, and reaches the retina. The cells in the retina line the back of the eye, except for where the optic nerve exits; this results in a blind spot.

There are two types of photoreceptor cells, rods and cones, which are sensitive to different aspects of light. Rod cells are sensitive to the intensity of light over a wide frequency range, thus are responsible for black-and-white vision. Rod cells are not present on the fovea, the area of the retina responsible for central vision, and are not as responsive as cone cells to spatial and temporal changes in light. There are, however, twenty times more rod cells than cone cells in the retina because the rod cells are present across a wider area. Because of their wider distribution, rods are responsible for peripheral vision.

In contrast, cone cells are less sensitive to the overall intensity of light, but come in three varieties that are sensitive to different frequency-ranges and thus are used in the perception of colour and photopic vision. Cone cells are highly concentrated in the fovea and have a high visual acuity meaning that they are better at spatial resolution than rod cells. Since cone cells are not as sensitive to dim light as rod cells, most night vision is limited to rod cells. Likewise, since cone cells are in the fovea, central vision (including the vision needed to do most reading, fine detail work such as sewing, or careful examination of objects) is done by cone cells.

Ciliary muscles around the lens allow the eye's focus to be adjusted. This process is known as accommodation. The near point and far point define the nearest and farthest distances from the eye at which an object can be brought into sharp focus. For a person with normal vision, the far point is located at infinity. The near point's location depends on how much the muscles can increase the curvature of the lens, and how inflexible the lens has become with age. Optometrists, ophthalmologists, and opticians usually consider an appropriate near point to be closer than normal reading distance—approximately 25 cm.

Defects in vision can be explained using optical principles. As people age, the lens becomes less flexible and the near point recedes from the eye, a condition known as presbyopia. Similarly, people suffering from hyperopia cannot decrease the focal length of their lens enough to allow for nearby objects to be imaged on their retina. Conversely, people who cannot increase the focal length of their lens enough to allow for distant objects to be imaged on the retina suffer from myopia and have a far point that is considerably closer than infinity. A condition known as astigmatism results when the cornea is not spherical but instead is more curved in one direction. This causes horizontally extended objects to be focused on different parts of the retina than vertically extended objects, and results in distorted images.

All of these conditions can be corrected using corrective lenses. For presbyopia and hyperopia, a converging lens provides the extra curvature necessary to bring the near point closer to the eye while for myopia a diverging lens provides the curvature necessary to send the far point to infinity. Astigmatism is corrected with a cylindrical surface lens that curves more strongly in one direction than in another, compensating for the non-uniformity of the cornea.

The optical power of corrective lenses is measured in diopters, a value equal to the reciprocal of the focal length measured in metres; with a positive focal length corresponding to a converging lens and a negative focal length corresponding to a diverging lens. For lenses that correct for astigmatism as well, three numbers are given: one for the spherical power, one for the cylindrical power, and one for the angle of orientation of the astigmatism.

==== Visual effects ====
The Ponzo Illusion relies on the fact that parallel lines appear to converge as they approach infinity.

Optical illusions (also called visual illusions) are characterized by visually perceived images that differ from objective reality. The information gathered by the eye is processed in the brain to give a percept that differs from the object being imaged. Optical illusions can be the result of a variety of phenomena including physical effects that create images that are different from the objects that make them, the physiological effects on the eyes and brain of excessive stimulation (e.g. brightness, tilt, colour, movement), and cognitive illusions where the eye and brain make unconscious inferences.

Cognitive illusions include some which result from the unconscious misapplication of certain optical principles. For example, the Ames room, Hering, Müller-Lyer, Orbison, Ponzo, Sander, and Wundt illusions all rely on the suggestion of the appearance of distance by using converging and diverging lines, in the same way that parallel light rays (or indeed any set of parallel lines) appear to converge at a vanishing point at infinity in two-dimensionally rendered images with artistic perspective. This suggestion is also responsible for the famous moon illusion where the moon, despite having essentially the same angular size, appears much larger near the horizon than it does at zenith. This illusion so confounded Ptolemy that he incorrectly attributed it to atmospheric refraction when he described it in his treatise, Optics.

Another type of optical illusion exploits broken patterns to trick the mind into perceiving symmetries or asymmetries that are not present. Examples include the café wall, Ehrenstein, Fraser spiral, Poggendorff, and Zöllner illusions. Related, but not strictly illusions, are patterns that occur due to the superimposition of periodic structures. For example, transparent tissues with a grid structure produce shapes known as moiré patterns, while the superimposition of periodic transparent patterns comprising parallel opaque lines or curves produces line moiré patterns.

==== Optical instruments ====
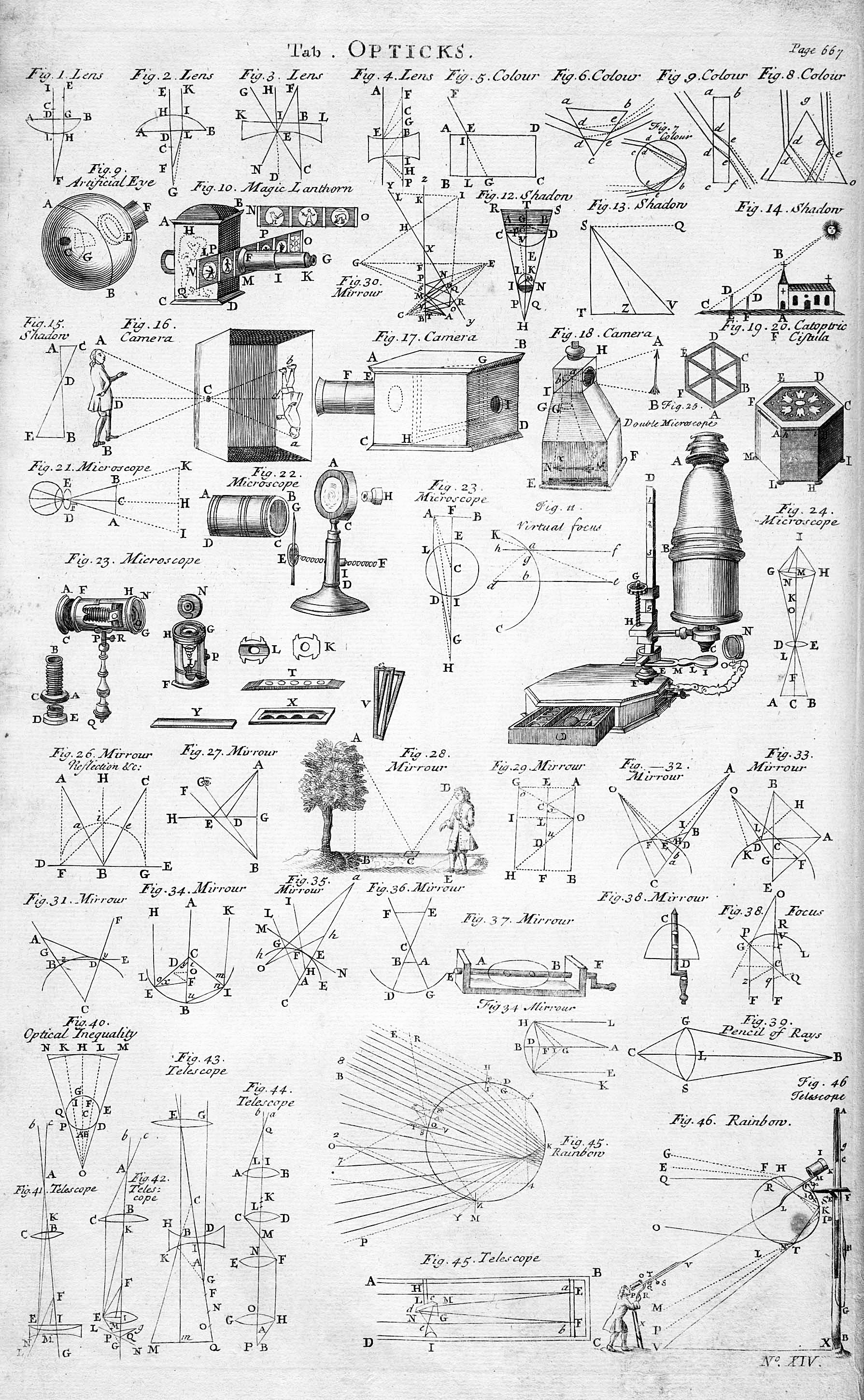
Illustrations of various optical instruments from the 1728 Cyclopaedia

Single lenses have a variety of applications including photographic lenses, corrective lenses, and magnifying glasses while single mirrors are used in parabolic reflectors and rear-view mirrors. Combining a number of mirrors, prisms, and lenses produces compound optical instruments which have practical uses. For example, a periscope is simply two plane mirrors aligned to allow for viewing around obstructions. The most famous compound optical instruments in science are the microscope and the telescope which were both invented by the Dutch in the late 16th century.

Microscopes were first developed with just two lenses: an objective lens and an eyepiece. The objective lens is essentially a magnifying glass and was designed with a very small focal length while the eyepiece generally has a longer focal length. This has the effect of producing magnified images of close objects. Generally, an additional source of illumination is used since magnified images are dimmer due to the conservation of energy and the spreading of light rays over a larger surface area. Modern microscopes, known as compound microscopes have many lenses in them (typically four) to optimize the functionality and enhance image stability. A slightly different variety of microscope, the comparison microscope, looks at side-by-side images to produce a stereoscopic binocular view that appears three dimensional when used by humans.

The first telescopes, called refracting telescopes, were also developed with a single objective and eyepiece lens. In contrast to the microscope, the objective lens of the telescope was designed with a large focal length to avoid optical aberrations. The objective focuses an image of a distant object at its focal point which is adjusted to be at the focal point of an eyepiece of a much smaller focal length. The main goal of a telescope is not necessarily magnification, but rather the collection of light which is determined by the physical size of the objective lens. Thus, telescopes are normally indicated by the diameters of their objectives rather than by the magnification which can be changed by switching eyepieces. Because the magnification of a telescope is equal to the focal length of the objective divided by the focal length of the eyepiece, smaller focal-length eyepieces cause greater magnification.

Since crafting large lenses is much more difficult than crafting large mirrors, most modern telescopes are reflecting telescopes, that is, telescopes that use a primary mirror rather than an objective lens. The same general optical considerations apply to reflecting telescopes that applied to refracting telescopes, namely, the larger the primary mirror, the more light collected, and the magnification is still equal to the focal length of the primary mirror divided by the focal length of the eyepiece. Professional telescopes generally do not have eyepieces and instead place an instrument (often a charge-coupled device) at the focal point instead.

=== Photography ===
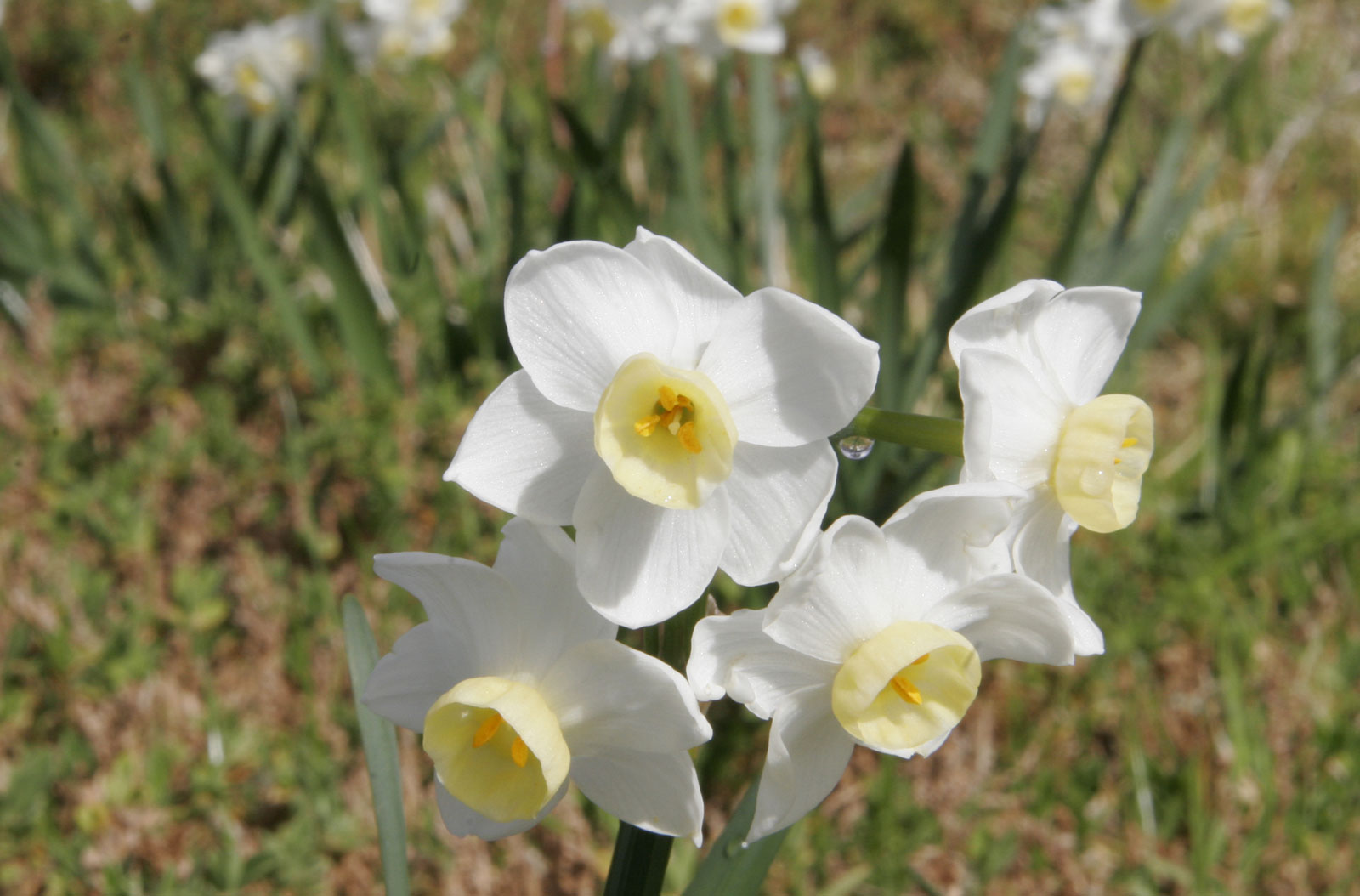
Photograph taken with aperture f/32

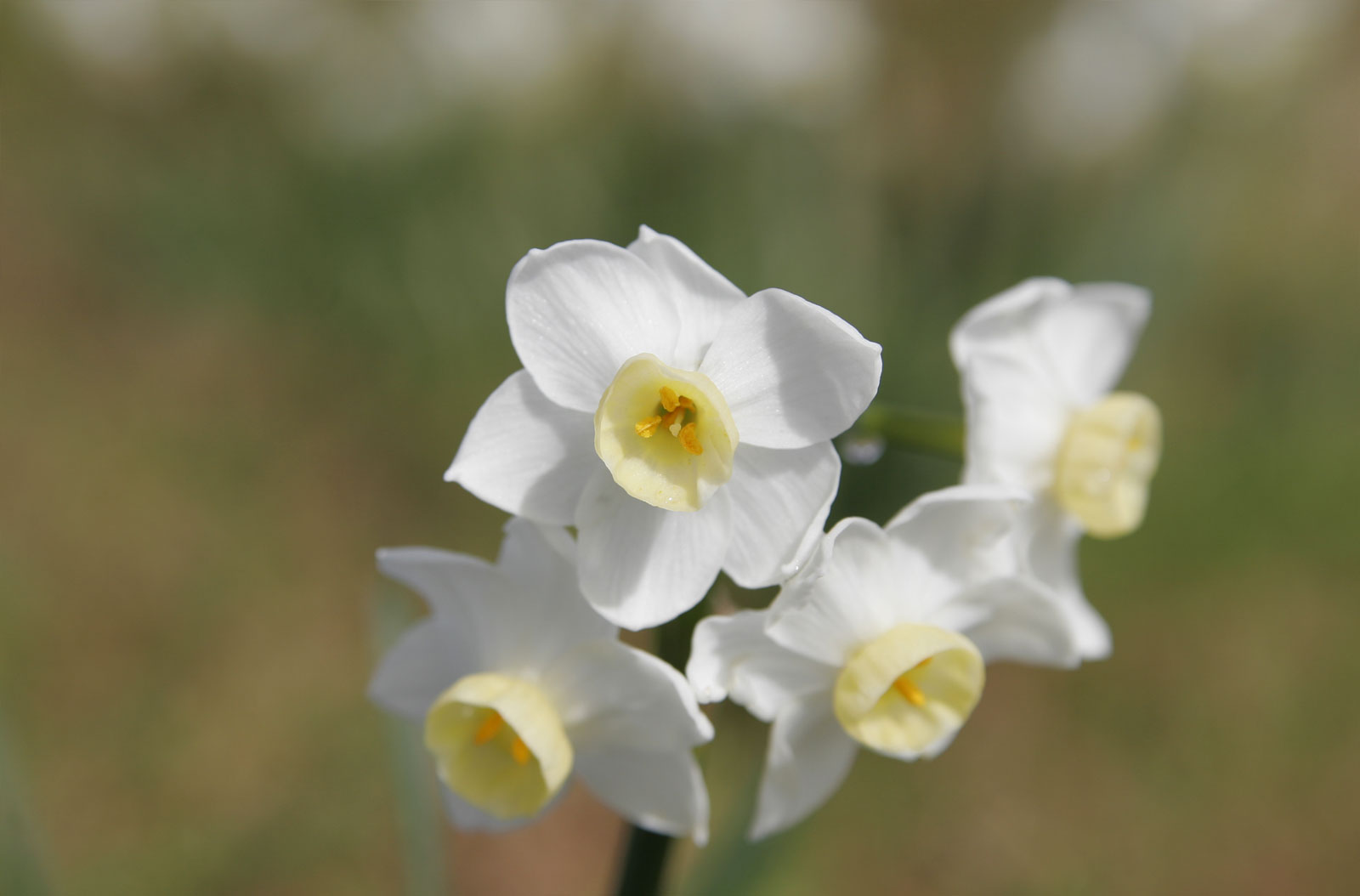
Photograph taken with aperture f/5

The optics of photography involves both lenses and the medium in which the electromagnetic radiation is recorded, whether it be a plate, film, or charge-coupled device. Photographers must consider the reciprocity of the camera and the shot which is summarized by the relation

Exposure ∝ ApertureArea × ExposureTime × SceneLuminance

In other words, the smaller the aperture (giving greater depth of focus), the less light coming in, so the length of time has to be increased (leading to possible blurriness if motion occurs). An example of the use of the law of reciprocity is the Sunny 16 rule which gives a rough estimate for the settings needed to estimate the proper exposure in daylight.

A camera's aperture is measured by a unitless number called the f-number or f-stop, f/#, often notated as $N$, and given by

$$f/\# = N = \frac fD \$$

where $f$ is the focal length, and $D$ is the diameter of the entrance pupil. By convention, "f/#" is treated as a single symbol, and specific values of f/# are written by replacing the number sign with the value. The two ways to increase the f-stop are to either decrease the diameter of the entrance pupil or change to a longer focal length (in the case of a zoom lens, this can be done by simply adjusting the lens). Higher f-numbers also have a larger depth of field due to the lens approaching the limit of a pinhole camera which is able to focus all images perfectly, regardless of distance, but requires very long exposure times.

The field of view that the lens will provide changes with the focal length of the lens. There are three basic classifications based on the relationship to the diagonal size of the film or sensor size of the camera to the focal length of the lens:

- Normal lens: angle of view of about 50° (called normal because this angle considered roughly equivalent to human vision) and a focal length approximately equal to the diagonal of the film or sensor.
- Wide-angle lens: angle of view wider than 60° and focal length shorter than a normal lens.
- Long focus lens: angle of view narrower than a normal lens. This is any lens with a focal length longer than the diagonal measure of the film or sensor. The most common type of long focus lens is the telephoto lens, a design that uses a special telephoto group to be physically shorter than its focal length.

Modern zoom lenses may have some or all of these attributes.

The required exposure time depends on how sensitive to light the medium being used is (measured by the film speed, or, for digital media, by the quantum efficiency). Early photography used media that had very low light sensitivity, and so exposure times had to be long even for very bright shots. As technology has improved, so has the sensitivity through film cameras and digital cameras.

Other results from physical and geometrical optics apply to camera optics. For example, the maximum resolution capability of a particular camera set-up is determined by the diffraction limit associated with the pupil size and given, roughly, by the Rayleigh criterion.

=== Atmospheric optics ===
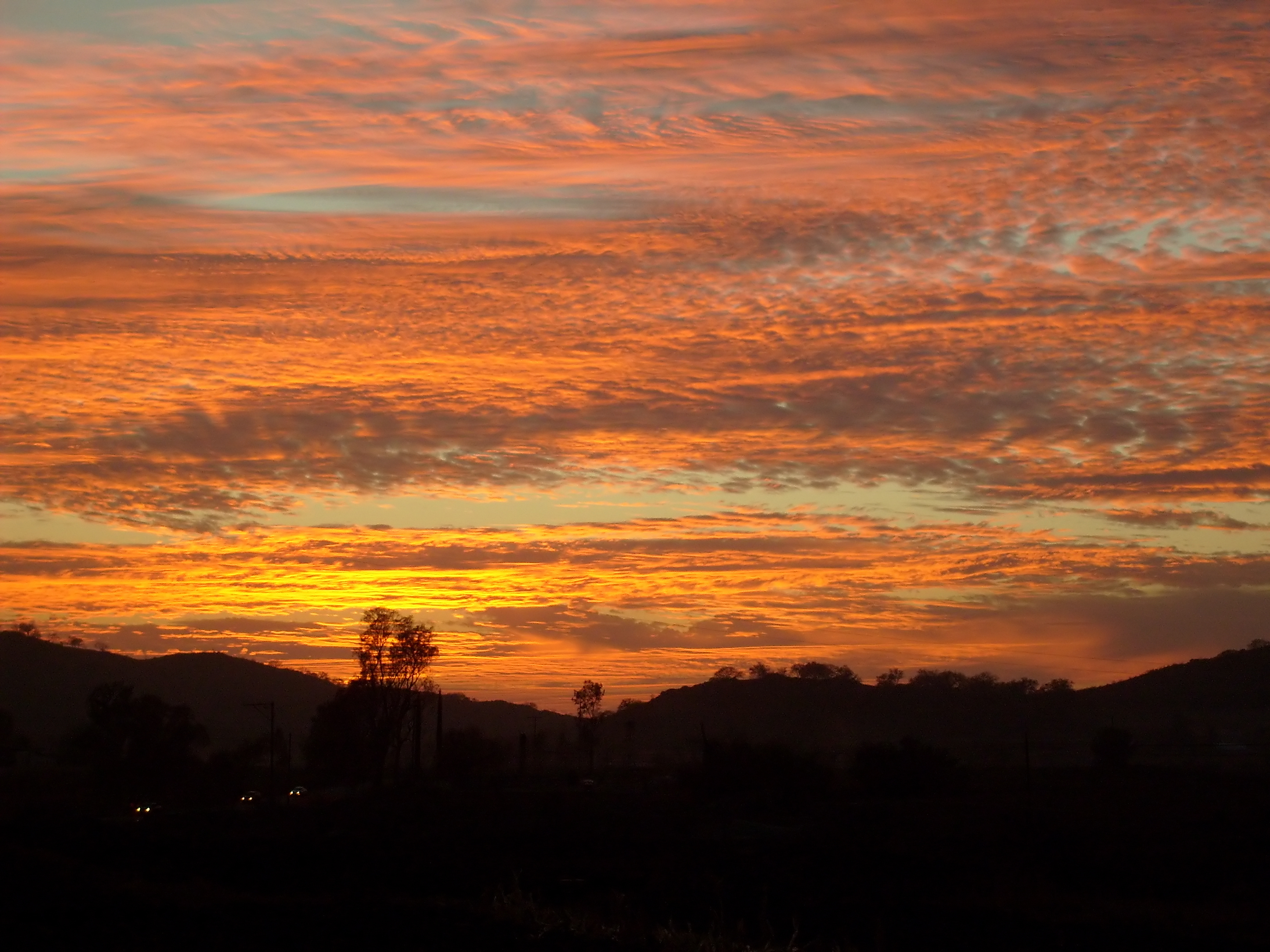
A colourful sky is often due to scattering of light off particulates and pollution, as in this photograph of a sunset during the October 2007 California wildfires.

The unique optical properties of the atmosphere cause a wide range of spectacular optical phenomena. The blue colour of the sky is a direct result of Rayleigh scattering which redirects higher frequency (blue) sunlight back into the field of view of the observer. Because blue light is scattered more easily than red light, the sun takes on a reddish hue when it is observed through a thick atmosphere, as during a sunrise or sunset. Additional particulate matter in the sky can scatter different colours at different angles creating colourful glowing skies at dusk and dawn. Scattering off of ice crystals and other particles in the atmosphere are responsible for halos, afterglows, coronas, rays of sunlight, and sun dogs. The variation in these kinds of phenomena is due to different particle sizes and geometries.

Mirages are optical phenomena in which light rays are bent due to thermal variations in the refraction index of air, producing displaced or heavily distorted images of distant objects. Other dramatic optical phenomena associated with this include the Novaya Zemlya effect where the sun appears to rise earlier than predicted with a distorted shape. A spectacular form of refraction occurs with a temperature inversion called the Fata Morgana where objects on the horizon or even beyond the horizon, such as islands, cliffs, ships or icebergs, appear elongated and elevated, like "fairy tale castles".

Rainbows are the result of a combination of internal reflection and dispersive refraction of light in raindrops. A single reflection off the backs of an array of raindrops produces a rainbow with an angular size on the sky that ranges from 40° to 42° with red on the outside. Double rainbows are produced by two internal reflections with angular size of 50.5° to 54° with violet on the outside. Because rainbows are seen with the sun 180° away from the centre of the rainbow, rainbows are more prominent the closer the sun is to the horizon.

== History ==
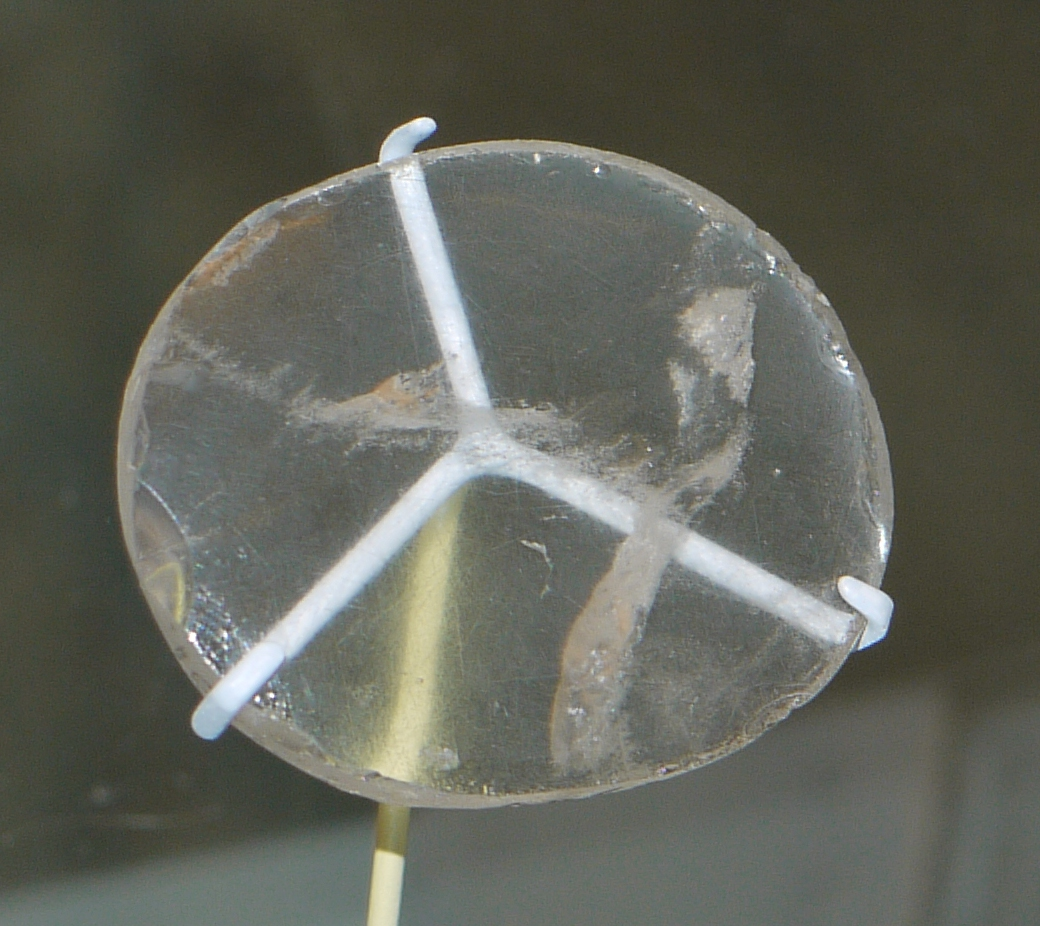
The Nimrud lens

Optics began with the development of lenses by the ancient Egyptians and Mesopotamians. The earliest known lenses, made from polished crystal, often quartz, date from as early as 2000 BC from Crete (Archaeological Museum of Heraclion, Greece). Lenses from Rhodes date around 700 BC, as do Assyrian lenses such as the Nimrud lens. The ancient Romans and Greeks filled glass spheres with water to make lenses. These practical developments were followed by the development of theories of light and vision by ancient Greek and Indian philosophers, and the development of geometrical optics in the Greco-Roman world. The word optics comes from the ancient Greek word ὀπτική, optikē 'appearance, look'.

Greek philosophy on optics broke down into two opposing theories on how vision worked, the intromission theory and the emission theory. The intromission approach saw vision as coming from objects casting off copies of themselves (called eidola) that were captured by the eye. With many propagators including Democritus, Epicurus, Aristotle and their followers, this theory seems to have some contact with modern theories of what vision really is, but it remained only speculation lacking any experimental foundation.

Plato first articulated the emission theory, the idea that visual perception is accomplished by rays emitted by the eyes. He also commented on the parity reversal of mirrors in Timaeus. Some hundred years later, Euclid (4th–3rd century BC) wrote a treatise entitled Optics where he linked vision to geometry, creating geometrical optics. He based his work on Plato's emission theory wherein he described the mathematical rules of perspective and described the effects of refraction qualitatively, although he questioned that a beam of light from the eye could instantaneously light up the stars every time someone blinked. Euclid stated the principle of the shortest trajectory of light, and considered multiple reflections on flat and spherical mirrors. Ptolemy, in his treatise Optics, held an extramission-intromission theory of vision: the rays (or flux) from the eye formed a cone, the vertex being within the eye, and the base defining the visual field. The rays were sensitive, and conveyed information back to the observer's intellect about the distance and orientation of surfaces. He summarized much of Euclid and went on to describe a way to measure the angle of refraction, though he failed to notice the empirical relationship between it and the angle of incidence. Plutarch (1st–2nd century AD) described multiple reflections on spherical mirrors and discussed the creation of magnified and reduced images, both real and imaginary, including the case of chirality of the images.

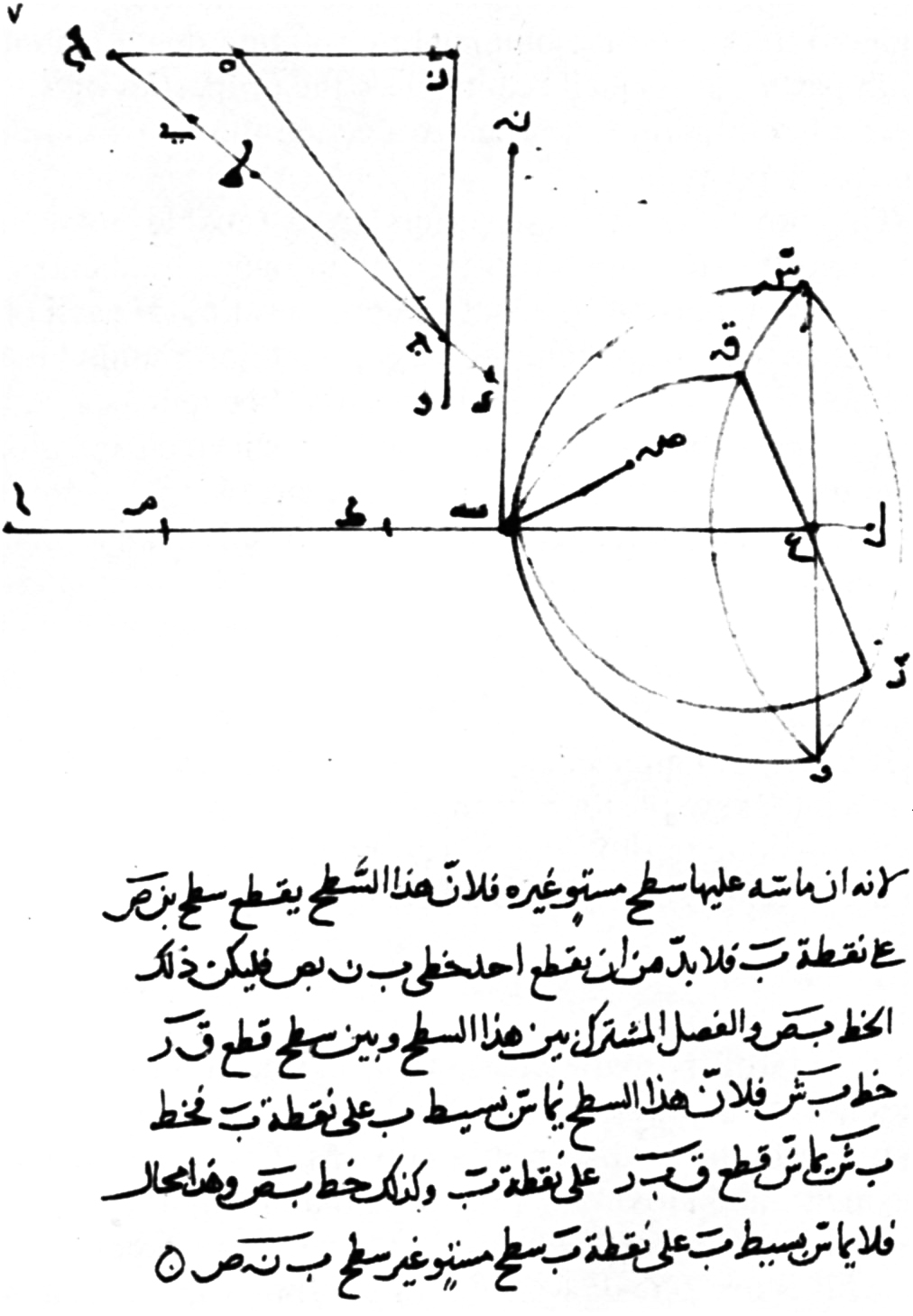
Reproduction of a page of Ibn Sahl's manuscript showing his knowledge of the law of refraction

During the Middle Ages, Greek ideas about optics were resurrected and extended by writers in the Muslim world. One of the earliest of these was Al-Kindi (c. 801–873) who wrote on the merits of Aristotelian and Euclidean ideas of optics, favouring the emission theory since it could better quantify optical phenomena. In 984, the Persian mathematician Ibn Sahl wrote the treatise "On burning mirrors and lenses", correctly describing a law of refraction equivalent to Snell's law. He used this law to compute optimum shapes for lenses and curved mirrors. In the early 11th century, Alhazen (Ibn al-Haytham) wrote the Book of Optics (Kitab al-manazir) in which he explored reflection and refraction and proposed a new system for explaining vision and light based on observation and experiment. He rejected the "emission theory" of Ptolemaic optics with its rays being emitted by the eye, and instead put forward the idea that light reflected in all directions in straight lines from all points of the objects being viewed and then entered the eye, although he was unable to correctly explain how the eye captured the rays. Alhazen's work was largely ignored in the Arabic world but it was anonymously translated into Latin around 1200 A.D. and further summarised and expanded on by the Polish monk Witelo making it a standard text on optics in Europe for the next 400 years.

In the 13th century in medieval Europe, English bishop Robert Grosseteste wrote on a wide range of scientific topics, and discussed light from four different perspectives: an epistemology of light, a metaphysics or cosmogony of light, an etiology or physics of light, and a theology of light, basing it on the works of Aristotle and Platonism. Grosseteste's most famous disciple, Roger Bacon, wrote works citing a wide range of recently translated optical and philosophical works, including those of Alhazen, Aristotle, Avicenna, Averroes, Euclid, al-Kindi, Ptolemy, Tideus, and Constantine the African. Bacon was able to use parts of glass spheres as magnifying glasses to demonstrate that light reflects from objects rather than being released from them.

The first wearable eyeglasses were invented in Italy around 1286. This was the start of the optical industry of grinding and polishing lenses for these "spectacles", first in Venice and Florence in the thirteenth century, and later in the spectacle making centres in both the Netherlands and Germany. Spectacle makers created improved types of lenses for the correction of vision based more on empirical knowledge gained from observing the effects of the lenses rather than using the rudimentary optical theory of the day (theory which for the most part could not even adequately explain how spectacles worked). This practical development, mastery, and experimentation with lenses led directly to the invention of the compound optical microscope around 1595, and the refracting telescope in 1608, both of which appeared in the spectacle making centres in the Netherlands.

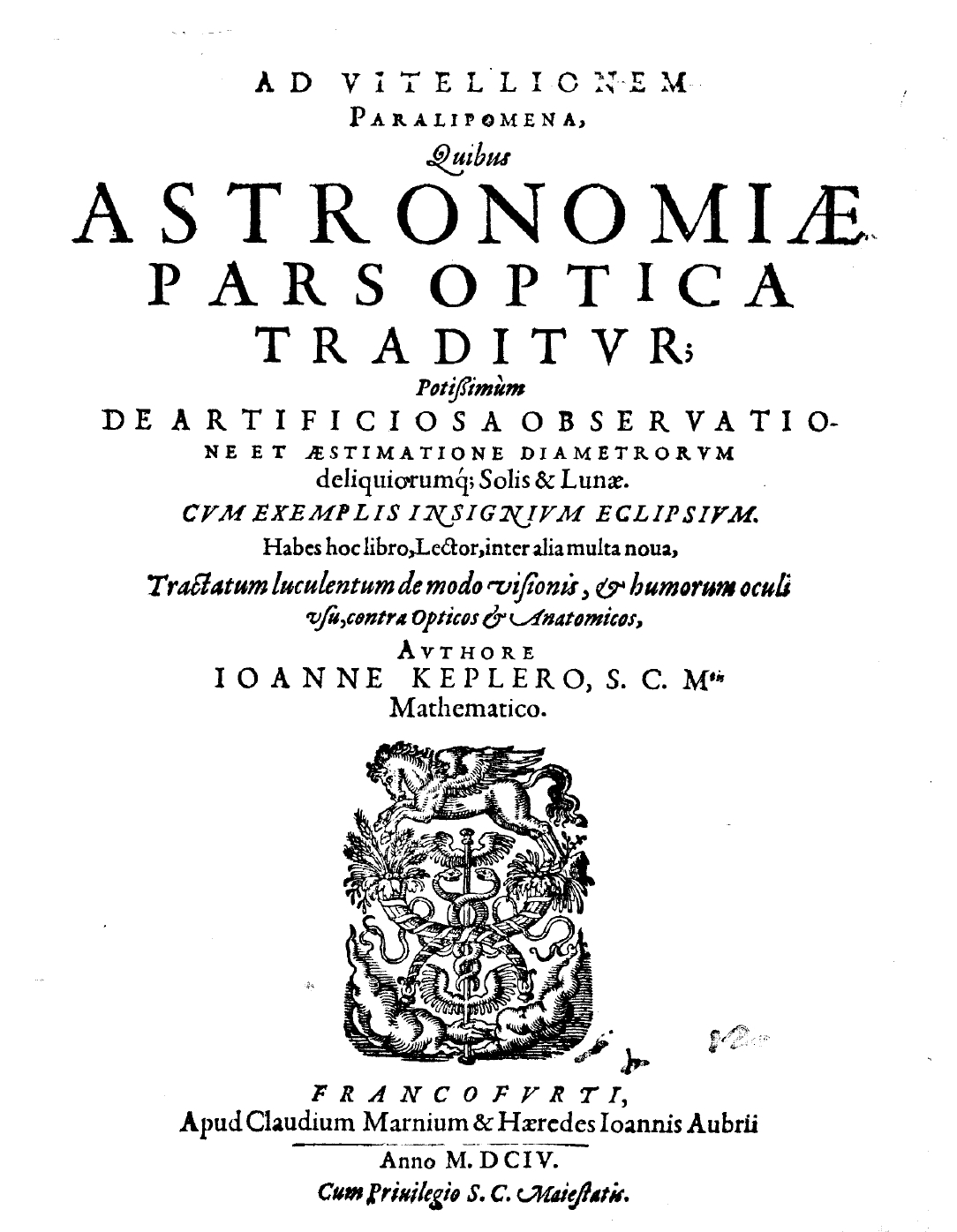
The first treatise about optics by Johannes Kepler, Ad Vitellionem paralipomena quibus astronomiae pars optica traditur (1604), generally recognized as the foundation of modern optics.

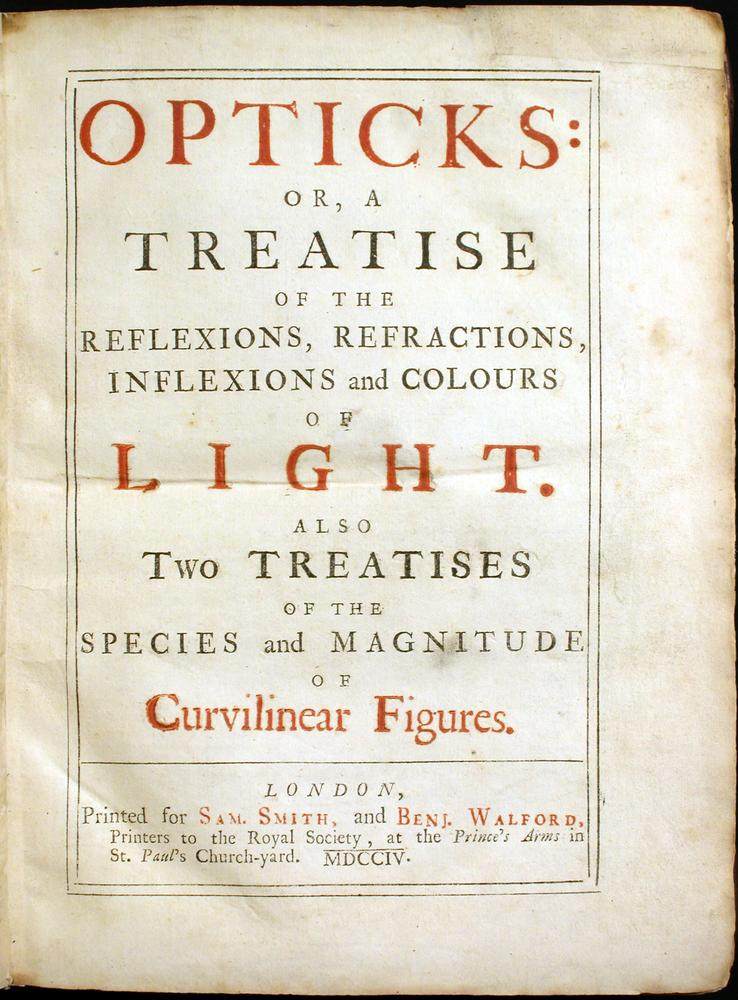
Cover of the first edition of Newton's Opticks (1704)

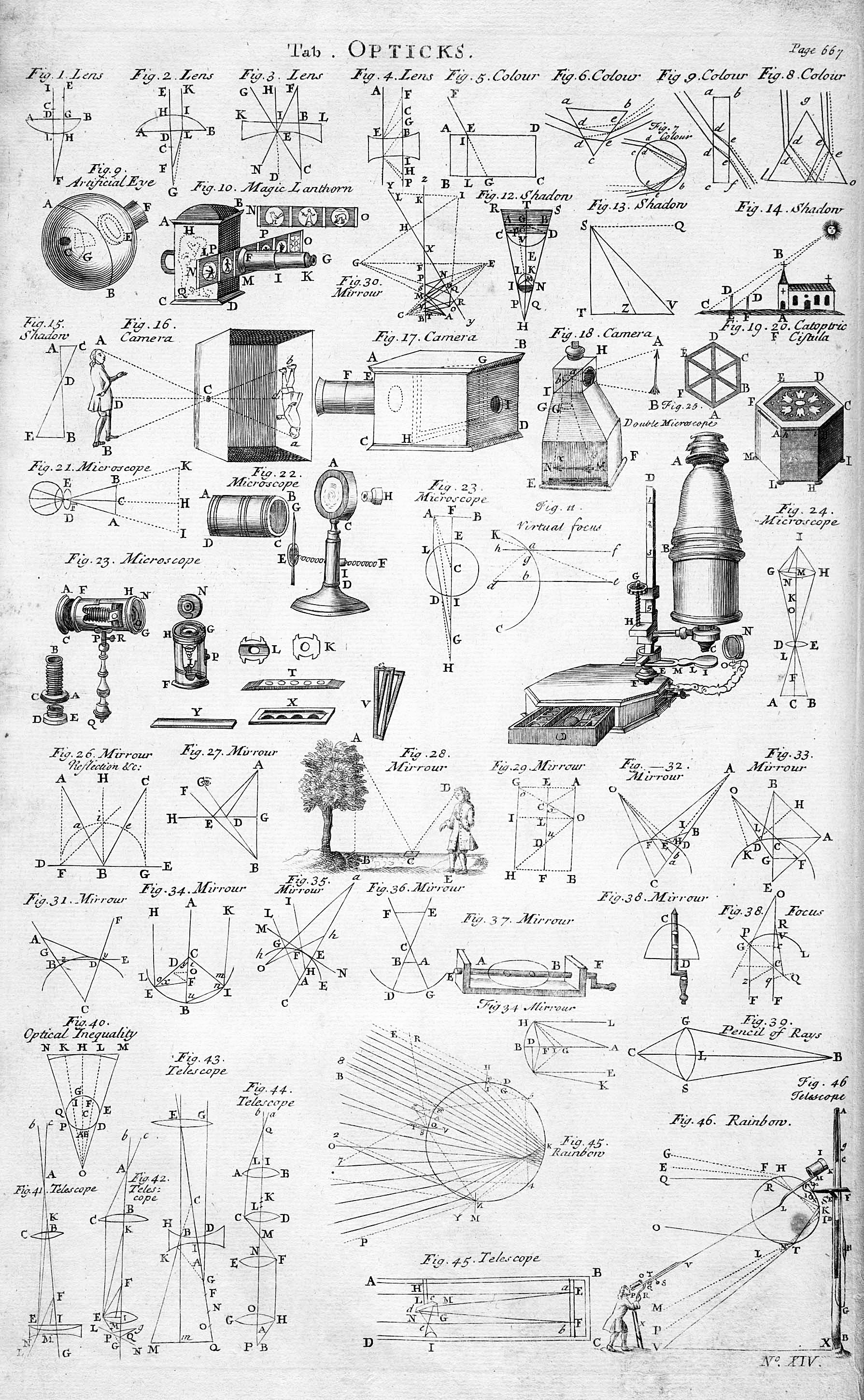
Board with optical devices, 1728 Cyclopaedia

In the early 17th century, Johannes Kepler expanded on geometric optics in his writings, covering lenses, reflection by flat and curved mirrors, the principles of pinhole cameras, inverse-square law governing the intensity of light, and the optical explanations of astronomical phenomena such as lunar and solar eclipses and astronomical parallax. He was also able to correctly deduce the role of the retina as the actual organ that recorded images, finally being able to scientifically quantify the effects of different types of lenses that spectacle makers had been observing over the previous 300 years. After the invention of the telescope, Kepler set out the theoretical basis on how they worked and described an improved version, known as the Keplerian telescope, using two convex lenses to produce higher magnification.

Optical theory progressed in the mid-17th century with treatises written by philosopher René Descartes, which explained a variety of optical phenomena including reflection and refraction by assuming that light was emitted by objects which produced it. This differed substantively from the ancient Greek emission theory. In the late 1660s and early 1670s, Isaac Newton expanded Descartes's ideas into a corpuscle theory of light, famously determining that white light was a mix of colours that can be separated into its component parts with a prism. In 1690, Christiaan Huygens proposed a wave theory for light based on suggestions that had been made by Robert Hooke in 1664. Hooke himself publicly criticised Newton's theories of light and the feud between the two lasted until Hooke's death. In 1704 Newton published Opticks, and he was generally considered to be the victor in the debate over the nature of light, partly because of his success in other areas of physics at the time.

Newtonian optics was generally accepted until the early 19th century when Thomas Young and Augustin-Jean Fresnel conducted experiments on the interference of light that firmly established light's wave nature. Young's famous double slit experiment showed that light followed the superposition principle, which is a wave-like property not predicted by Newton's corpuscle theory. This work led to a theory of diffraction for light and opened an entire area of study in physical optics. Wave optics was successfully unified with electromagnetic theory by James Clerk Maxwell in the 1860s.

The next development in optical theory came in 1899 when Max Planck correctly modelled blackbody radiation by assuming that the exchange of energy between light and matter only occurred in discrete amounts he called quanta. In 1905, Albert Einstein published the theory of the photoelectric effect that firmly established the quantization of light itself. In 1913, Niels Bohr showed that atoms could only emit discrete amounts of energy, thus explaining the discrete lines seen in emission and absorption spectra. The understanding of the interaction between light and matter that followed from these developments not only formed the basis of quantum optics but also was crucial for the development of quantum mechanics as a whole. The ultimate culmination, the theory of quantum electrodynamics, explains all optics and electromagnetic processes in general as the result of the exchange of real and virtual photons. Quantum optics gained practical importance with the inventions of the maser in 1953 and of the laser in 1960.

Following the work of Paul Dirac in quantum field theory, George Sudarshan, Roy J. Glauber, and Leonard Mandel applied quantum theory to the electromagnetic field in the 1950s and 1960s to gain a more detailed understanding of photodetection and the statistics of light.

== See also ==
- Ion optics
- Important publications in optics
- List of optical topics
- List of textbooks in electromagnetism
