= Erect image =

Image that appears right-side up in optics

In optics, an erect image is one that appears right-side up. An image is formed when rays from a point on the original object meet again after passing through an optical system. In an erect image, directions are the same as those in the object, in contrast to an inverted image. It is one of the properties of images formed in a plane mirror.

Some telescopes and other devices such as the camera obscura present an inverted image on the viewing surface. Mirrors and compound prism elements can be used to achieve an erect image instead.

== See also ==
- Real image
- Virtual image
- Mirror image
