= Virtual microscope project =

The Virtual Microscope project is an initiative to make micromorphology and behavior of some small organisms available online. Images are from Antarctica and the Baltic Sea are available at no cost. Images are offered in higher magnification or lower resolution. Varieties of images offer can include scanning electron microscopy, transmission electron microscopy, and are accompanied by related publications for research. The site interface is deliberately kept simple with tutorials offered in several areas. The editorial board consists of professors from several universities worldwide. Its global scope was added after its foundation, and it supervised by Rutgers University.
