= Optical sine theorem =

In optics, the optical sine theorem states that the products of the index, height, and sine of the slope angle of a ray in object space and its corresponding ray in image space are equal. That is:

$$n_{0}y_{0}a_{0}=n_{i}y_{i}a_{i}$$
