= Dynameter =

A dynameter is an instrument that measures the magnification of a telescope. It is usually a double-image micrometer used to measure the diameter of the image of the object glass. The magnifying power is found by comparing the actual diameter of the glass with the measured diameter of the image of the glass.

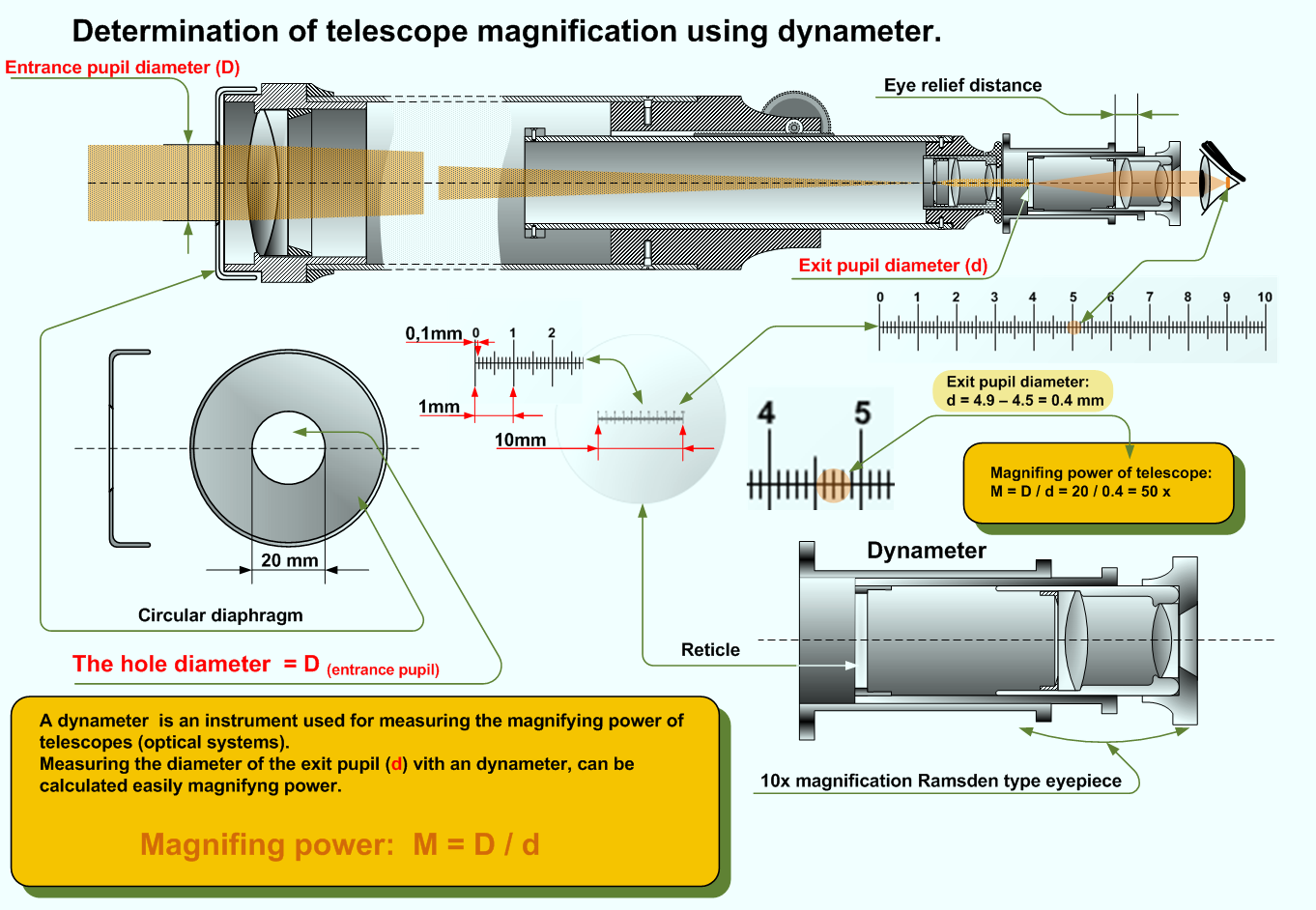

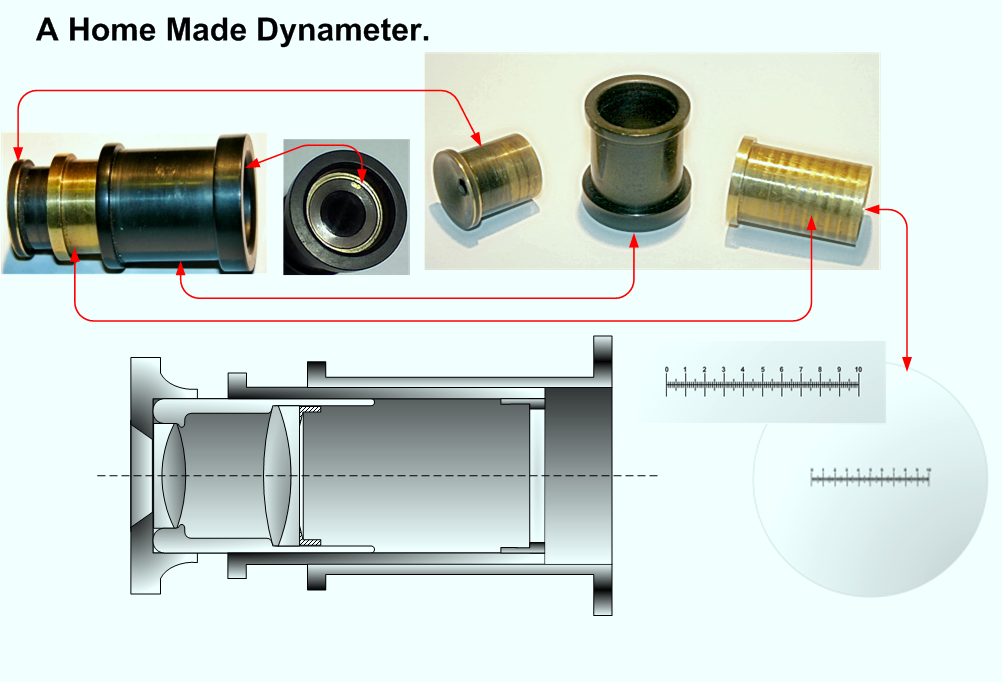
