= Inverse problem in optics =

The inverse problem in optics (or the inverse optics problem) refers to the fundamentally ambiguous mapping between sources of retinal stimulation and the retinal images that are caused by those sources. For example, the size of an object, the orientation of the object, and its distance from the observer are conflated in the retinal image. For any given projection on the retina there are an infinite number of pairings of object size, orientation and distance that could have given rise to that projection on the retina. Because the image on the retina does not specify which pairing did in fact cause the image, this and other aspects of vision qualify as an inverse problem.
