= Magnification =

Process of enlarging the apparent size of something

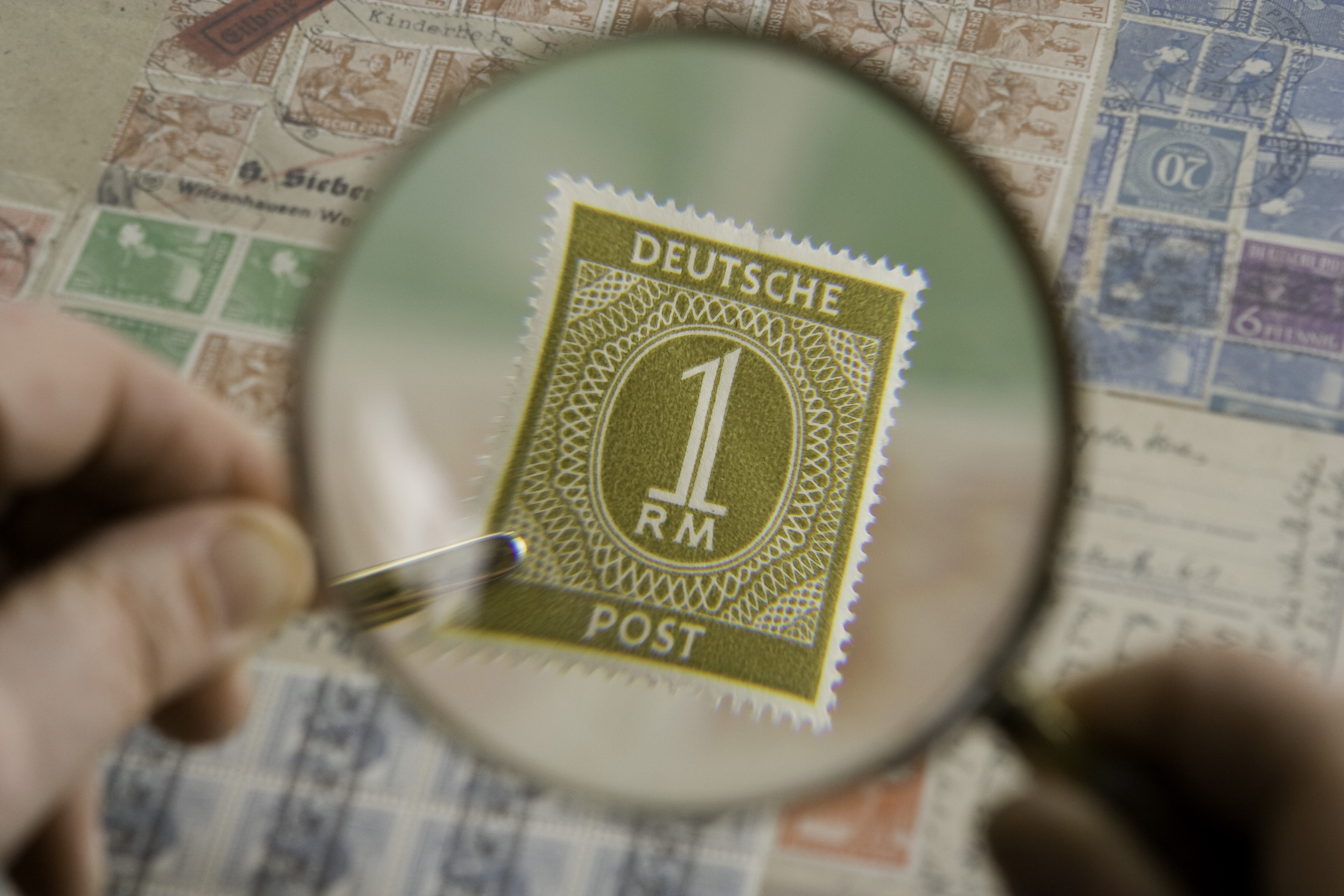
The postage stamp appears larger with the use of a magnifying glass.

Stepwise magnification by 6% per frame into a 39-megapixel image. In the final frame, at about 170×, an image of a bystander is seen reflected in the man's cornea.

Magnification is the process of enlarging the apparent size, not physical size, of something. This enlargement is quantified by a size ratio called optical magnification or magnification ratio. When this ratio is less than one, it refers to a reduction in size, sometimes called de-magnification.

Magnification is related to scaling up visuals or images to be able to see more detail, increasing resolution. Typically, magnification is achieved using optical instruments (magnifying glass, microscope, telescope, etc.), printing techniques, or digital processing (digital magnification). In all cases, the magnification of the image does not change the perspective of the image.

== Examples of magnification ==
Some optical instruments provide visual aid by magnifying small or distant subjects.

- A magnifying glass, which uses a positive (convex) lens to make things look bigger by allowing the user to hold them closer to their eye.
- A telescope, which uses its large objective lens or primary mirror to create an image of a distant object and then allows the user to examine the image closely with a smaller eyepiece lens, thus making the object look larger.
- A microscope, which makes a small object appear as a much larger image at a comfortable distance for viewing. A microscope is similar in layout to a telescope except that the object being viewed is close to the objective, which is usually much smaller than the eyepiece.
- A slide projector, which projects a large image of a small slide on a screen. A photographic enlarger is similar.
- A zoom lens, a system of camera lens elements for which the focal length and angle of view can be varied.

== Magnification ratios ==
Magnification is characterized by ratios of two sizes. These ratios are therefore dimensionless numbers.

Optical magnification is the ratio between the size of an image and the size of the original object.

Magnification ratio is the ratio between the apparent size of an object and its true or unmagnified view. This ratio is sometimes referred to as "power" (for example "10× power"), although this can lead to confusion with optical power.

=== Linear or transverse magnification ===
For real images, such as images projected on a screen, size means a linear dimension (measured, for example, in millimeters or inches).

=== Angular magnification ===
For an optical instrument with an eyepiece as an example, the linear dimension of an image seen through the eyepiece cannot be given if it is an virtual image at an infinite distance, thus size in this case may mean the angle subtended between an edge (or both edges, depending on the definition) of the image and the optical axis of the instrument (angular size). Strictly speaking, one should take the tangent of that angle (in practice, this makes a difference only if the angle is larger than a few degrees). Thus, angular magnification is given by

$$M_A=\frac{\tan \varepsilon}{\tan \varepsilon_0}\approx \frac{\varepsilon}{ \varepsilon_0}$$

where $\varepsilon_0$ is the angle subtended by an object (w.r.t the optical axis) and $\varepsilon$ is the angle subtended by its image (also w.r.t the optical axis) made by an optical instrument.

For example, the mean angular size of the Moon's disk as viewed from Earth's surface is about 0.52°. Thus, through binoculars with 10× magnification, the Moon appears to subtend an angle of about 5.2°.

By convention, for magnifying glasses and optical microscopes, where the size of an object is a linear dimension and the apparent size (the image size) of it is an angle, the magnification is the ratio between the apparent (angular) size as seen via instrument and the angular size of the object when the object is placed at the conventional closest distance of distinct vision to an unaided human eye: 25 cm from the eye (called the near point).

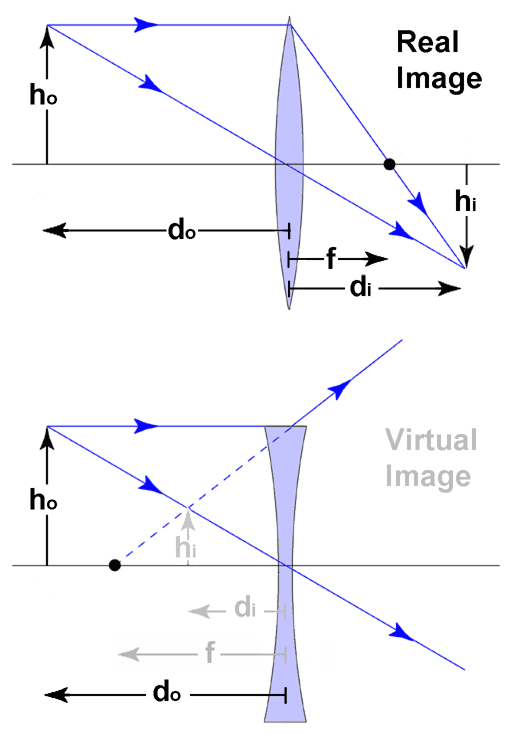
A thin lens where black dimensions are real, the greys are virtual.

== By instrument ==
=== Single lens ===
The linear magnification of a thin lens is

$$M = {f \over f-d_\mathrm{o}} = - \frac{f}{x_o}$$

where $f$ is the focal length, $d_\mathrm{o}$ is the distance from the lens to the object, and $x_0 = d_0 - f$ as the distance of the object with respect to the front focal point. A sign convention is used such that $d_0$ and $d_i$ (the image distance from the lens) are positive for real object and image, respectively, and negative for virtual object and images, respectively. $f$ of a converging lens is positive while for a diverging lens it is negative.

For real images, $M$ is negative and the image is inverted. For virtual images, $M$ is positive and the image is upright.

With $d_\mathrm{i}$ being the distance from the lens to the image, $h_\mathrm{i}$ the height of the image and $h_\mathrm{o}$ the height of the object, the magnification can also be written as

$$M = -{d_\mathrm{i} \over d_\mathrm{o}} = {h_\mathrm{i} \over h_\mathrm{o}}$$

Note again that a negative magnification implies an inverted image.

The image magnification along the optical axis direction $M_L$, called longitudinal magnification, can also be defined. The Newtonian lens equation is stated as $f^2 = x_0 x_i$, where $x_0 = d_0 - f$ and $x_i = d_i - f$ as on-axis distances of an object and the image with respect to respective focal points, respectively. $M_L$ is defined as

$$M_L = \frac{dx_i}{dx_0},$$

and by using the Newtonian lens equation,

$$M_L = - \frac{f^2}{x_o^2} = - M^2.$$

The longitudinal magnification is always negative, meaning that the object and the image move in the same direction along the optical axis. The longitudinal magnification varies much faster than the transverse magnification, so the 3-dimensional image is distorted.

=== Photography ===
The image recorded by a photographic film or image sensor is always a real image and is usually inverted. When measuring the height of an inverted image using the cartesian sign convention (where the x-axis is the optical axis) the value for h_{i} will be negative, and as a result M will also be negative. However, the traditional sign convention used in photography is "real is positive, virtual is negative". Therefore, in photography: Object height and distance are always real and positive. When the focal length is positive the image's height, distance and magnification are real and positive. Only if the focal length is negative, the image's height, distance and magnification are virtual and negative. Therefore, the photographic magnification formulae are traditionally presented as

$$\begin{align}
M &= {d_\mathrm{i} \over d_\mathrm{o}} = {h_\mathrm{i} \over h_\mathrm{o}} \\
&= {f \over d_\mathrm{o}-f} = {d_\mathrm{i}-f \over f}
\end{align}$$

=== Magnifying glass ===
The angular magnification of a magnifying glass is defined as the ratio of an angle ε that the image (made by the glass) of an object located at the near point (typically 25 cm away from a human eye) subtends on the retina of the eye to an angle ε_{0} that the object (at the same location) subtends on the retina without the glass. The angular magnification is equal to the image size magnification on the retina because of (1) a part of the human eye refracting light toward the retina is considered a thin lens, (Note: For a thin lens, the optical center – a ray through this point has the property that lens entering and lens existing directions are parallel – and the aperture stop center – a ray though this point (called a chief ray) is considered the central ray of a ray bundle passing the aperture stop – are coincident, and the thickness of the lens is considered infinitesimally small. As a result, the chief ray just passes the geometric center of the lens (It is the optical center as well as the aperture stop center for this kind of lens.) without a deviation.) and (2) a circular shape of the retina; the twice angle between the eye's optical axis and the edge of the image on the retina (circularly shaped) is translated to twice larger the recognized image.

For a magnified and erected image of an object, the object needs to be located within the focal length of a converging lens (see the table Images of Real Objects Formed by Thin Lenses). The angular magnification of a converging lens as a magnifying glass, depends on how the glass and the object are located, relative to the eye.

The angular magnification M_{A} = ε/ε_{0} can be, in paraxial approximation where tan(ε) ≈ ε, expressed as (h_{i}/L_{i})/(h_{o}/L_{N}) = (h_{i}L_{N})/(h_{o}L_{i}) where h_{o} is for the object height (w.r.t the optical axis), h_{i} for the image height (also w.r.t the axis), L_{N} for the near point distance from the eye (along the optical axis), and L_{i} is the image distance from the eye (also along the axis).

By using the transverse magnification M = h_{i}/h_{o} = -d_{i}/d_{o}, M_{A} = -(d_{i}L_{N})/(d_{o}L_{i}). By using the thin lens equation 1/d_{o} + 1/d_{i} = 1/f (f as the focal length of the lens), M_{A} = (1 - d_{i}/f)(L_{N}/L_{i}). Because L_{i} = L_{l} - d_{i} (d_{i} is negative for a virtual image, made by a converging lens as a magnifying glass) so d_{i} = L_{l} - L_{i}, M_{A} becomes

$$M_\mathrm{A} = (L_\mathrm{N}/L_\mathrm{i})(1 - (L_\mathrm{l} - L_\mathrm{i})/f).$$

If the lens is held at a distance from the object such that its front focal point is on the object being viewed, the relaxed or unaccommodated eye (focused to infinity) can view the image (located at L_{i} = -∞) with the angular magnification (In the above expression of M_{A}, in the 2nd parenthesis, only 3rd term is survived.)

$$M_\mathrm{A}={25\ \mathrm{cm}\over f}.$$

Here, $f$ is the focal length of the lens in centimeters. The constant 25 cm is an estimate of the near point, the distance of the closest object position to the eye which forms a clear image on the retina. For $f < 25\ \mathrm{cm}$, The object via the glass looks larger because the subtended angle on the retina is larger, making the image size larger.

The same angular magnification is earned when the lens is positioned at the distance of f (the lens focal length) to the eye (L_{l} = f).

The largest angular magnification occurs when the image is at 25 cm to the eye (the near point), and the lens is very close to the eye (again, L_{l} ~ 0 and L_{i} = L_{N})

$$M_\mathrm{A}={25\ \mathrm{cm}\over f}+1$$

In this case the angular magnification equals the linear magnification (the increase in the relative height of the object) because both the object and the image are at the same position (the near point).

A different interpretation of the working of the latter case is that the magnifying glass changes the diopter of the eye (making it myopic) (Note: For thin lenses (the eye and the magnifying glass here) that are very close to each other in position, the total optical power of this optical system is approximately equal to the sum of each lens's optical power (see here).) so that the object can be placed closer to the eye resulting in a larger angular magnification.

=== Microscope ===
The angular magnification of a microscope is given by

$$M_\mathrm{A} = M_\mathrm{o} \times M_\mathrm{e}$$

where $M_\mathrm{o}$ is the magnification of the objective and $M_\mathrm{e}$ the magnification of the eyepiece. The magnification of the objective depends on its focal length $f_\mathrm{o}$ and on the distance $d$ between objective back focal plane and the focal plane of the eyepiece (called the tube length)

$$M_\mathrm{o}= - {d \over f_\mathrm{o}}$$

The magnification of the eyepiece depends upon its focal length $f_\mathrm{e}$ and is calculated by the same equation as that of a magnifying glass

$$M_\mathrm{e}={25\ \mathrm{cm} \over f_\mathrm{e}}$$

=== Telescope ===
The angular magnification of an optical telescope is given by

$$M_\mathrm{A}= - {f_\mathrm{o} \over f_\mathrm{e}}$$

in which $f_\mathrm{o}$ is the focal length of the objective lens in a refractor or of the primary mirror in a reflector, and $f_\mathrm{e}$ is the focal length of the eyepiece.

==== Measurement of telescope magnification ====
Measuring the actual angular magnification of a telescope is difficult, but it is possible to use the reciprocal relationship between the linear magnification and the angular magnification, since the linear magnification is constant for all objects.

The telescope is focused correctly for viewing objects at the distance for which the angular magnification is to be determined and then the object glass is used as an object the image of which is known as the exit pupil. The diameter of this may be measured using an instrument known as a Ramsden dynameter which consists of a Ramsden eyepiece with micrometer hairs in the back focal plane. This is mounted in front of the telescope eyepiece and used to evaluate the diameter of the exit pupil. This will be much smaller than the object glass diameter, which gives the linear magnification (actually a reduction), the angular magnification can be determined from

$$M_\mathrm{A} = {1 \over M} = {D_{\mathrm{Objective}} \over {D_\mathrm{Ramsden}}}\,.$$

== Maximum usable magnification ==
With any telescope, microscope or lens, a maximum magnification exists beyond which the image looks bigger but shows no more detail. It occurs when the finest detail the instrument can resolve is magnified to match the finest detail the eye can see. Magnification beyond this maximum is sometimes called "empty magnification".

For a good quality telescope operating in good atmospheric conditions, the maximum usable magnification is limited by diffraction. In practice it is considered to be 2× the aperture in millimetres or 50× the aperture in inches; so, a 60 mm diameter telescope has a maximum usable magnification of 120×.

With an optical microscope having a high numerical aperture and using oil immersion, the best possible resolution is 200 nm corresponding to a magnification of around 1200×. Without oil immersion, the maximum usable magnification is around 800×. For details, see limitations of optical microscopes.

Small, cheap telescopes and microscopes are sometimes supplied with the eyepieces that give magnification far higher than is usable.

The maximum relative to the minimum magnification of an optical system is known as zoom ratio.

== "Magnification" of displayed images ==
Magnification figures on pictures displayed in print or online can be misleading. Editors of journals and magazines routinely resize images to fit the page, making any magnification number provided in the figure legend incorrect. Images displayed on a computer screen change size based on the size of the screen. A scale bar (or micron bar) is a bar of stated length superimposed on a picture. When the picture is resized the bar will be resized in proportion. If a picture has a scale bar, the actual magnification can easily be calculated. Where the scale (magnification) of an image is important or relevant, including a scale bar is preferable to stating magnification.

== See also ==
- Lens
- Magnifying glass
- Microscope
- Optical telescope
- Screen magnifier
