= Near point =

Measurement in visual perception

In visual perception, the near point is the closest point at which an object can be placed and still form a focused image on the retina, within the eye's accommodation range. The other limit to the eye's accommodation range is the far point.

The near point is often characterized as its distance from an eye. A normal eye is considered to have a near point at about 11 cm (4.3 in) for a thirty year old. The near point is highly age dependent (see accommodation). A person with hyperopia or presbyopia would have a near point that is farther than normal.

Sometimes, near point is given in diopters (see Presbyopia § Mechanism), which refers to the inverse of the distance. For example a normal eye would have a near point of $\frac{1}{11\ \text{cm}} = 9\ \text{diopters}$.

Since objects appear larger as they are brought closer to the eye, one can obtain the best view of an object by holding it at the near point. As a result, the distance to the near point is called the distance of most distinct vision.

== Vision correction ==
A person with hyperopia has a near point that is further away than the typical near point for someone their age, and hence the person is unable to bring an object at the typical near point distance into sharp focus. A corrective lens can be used to correct hyperopia by imaging an object at the typical near point distance D onto a virtual image at the patient's actual near point, at distance NP. From the thin lens formula, the required lens will have optical power P given by

$$P \approx \frac{1}{D}-\frac{1}{\mathit{NP}}.$$

The calculation can be further improved by taking into account the distance between the spectacle lens and the human eye, which is usually about 1.5 cm:

$$P = \frac{1}{D-0.015\;\text{m}}-\frac{1}{\mathit{NP}-0.015\;\text{m}}.$$

For example, if a person has NP = 1 m and the typical near point distance at their age is D = 25 cm, then the optical power needed is P = +3.24 diopters where one diopter is the reciprocal of one meter.
