= Far point =

Farthest distance an eye can see

In visual perception, the far point is the farthest point at which an object can be placed (along the optical axis of the eye) for its image to be focused on the retina within the eye's accommodation. It is sometimes described as the farthest point from the eye at which images are clear. The other limit of eye's accommodation is the near point.

For an unaccommodated emmetropic eye, the far point is at infinity, but for the sake of practicality, infinity is considered to be 6 m (20 ft) because the accommodation change from 6 m to infinity is negligible. See visual acuity or Snellen chart for details about 6/6 (m) or 20/20 (ft) vision.

For an unaccommodated myopic eye, the far point is closer than 6 m. It depends upon the refractive error of the person's eye.

For an unaccommodated hypermetropic eye, incident light must be converging before entering the eye so as to focus on the retina. In this case (the hypermetropic eye) the focus point is behind the retina in virtual space, rather than on the retina screen.

Sometimes far point is given in diopters, the inverse of the distance in meters (see Simple myopia). For example, an individual who can see clearly out to 50 cm would have a far point of $\frac{1}{0.5\ \text{m}} = 2\ \text{diopters}$.

== Vision correction ==
A corrective lens can be used to correct myopia by imaging an object at infinity onto a virtual image at the patient's far point. According to the thin lens formula the required optical power P is

$$P \approx \frac{1}{\infty}-\frac{1}{\mathit FP} = -\frac{1}{\mathit FP},$$

where FP is the distance to the patient's far point. P is negative, because a diverging lens is required.

This calculation can be improved by taking into account the distance between the spectacle lens and the human eye, which is usually about 1.5 cm:

$$P = -\frac{1}{\mathit{FP}-0.015 \; \text{m}}.$$

For example, if a person has FP = 30 cm, then the optical power needed is P = −3.51 diopters where one diopter is the reciprocal of one meter.
