= Virtual image =

Collection of focus points made by extended diverging light rays

The formation of the virtual image A' of the object A via a plane mirror. For people looking at the mirror, the object A is apparently located at the position of A' although it does not physically exist there. The magnification of the virtual image formed by the plane mirror is 1.

In optics, the image of an object is defined as the collection of focus points of light rays coming from the object. A real image is the collection of focus points made by real converging rays, while a virtual image is the collection of focus points made by backward extensions of real diverging rays. A virtual image is found by tracing real rays, that emerge from an optical device (lens, mirror, or some combination), backward to perceived or apparent origins of real ray divergences. In other words, a virtual image point is from which the real rays appear (not actually) to be emitted (while a real image point is to which real rays converge).

There is a concept virtual object that is similarly defined; an object is virtual when forward extensions of real rays converge toward it. In other words, a virtual object point is to which the real rays appear (not actually) to converge (while a real object point is from which real rays emit). This is observed in ray tracing for a multi-lenses system (Note: In a compound lens, a virtual object, that is formed by a previous optical element (e.g., an interface between two different refractive indices) and located after the current optical element, may be an object for the current element to image.) or a diverging lens. For a diverging lens, forward extension of real converging rays toward it will meet the converging point, so the point is a virtual object.

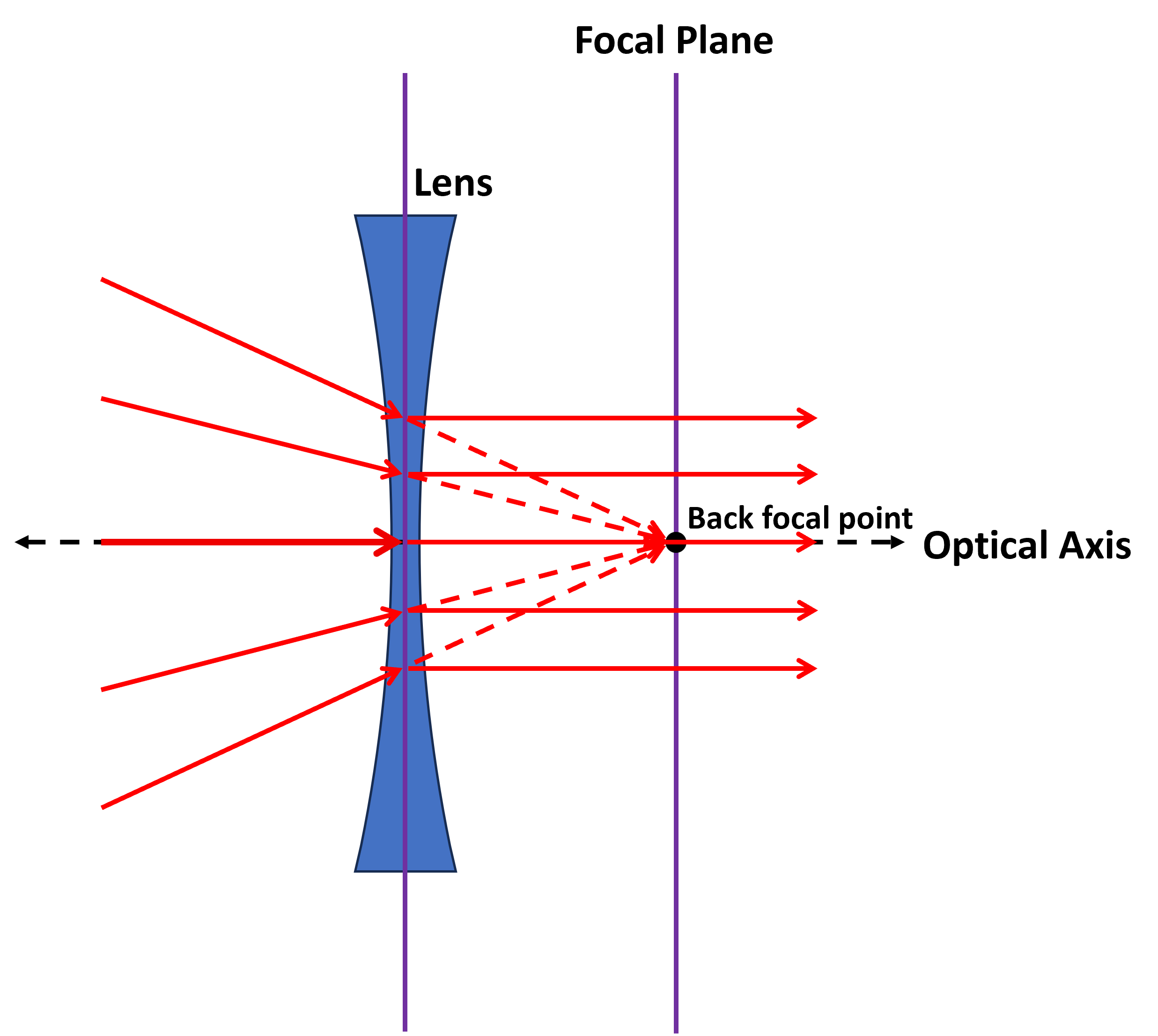
A diverging lens with converging rays on it. The back focal point of this lens is also the virtual object for these rays.

For a (refracting) lens, the real image of an object is formed on the opposite side of the lens while the virtual image is formed on the same side as the object. For a (reflecting) mirror, the real image is on the same side as the object while the virtual image is on the opposite side of, or "behind", the mirror. In diagrams of optical systems, virtual rays (forming virtual images) are conventionally represented by dotted lines, to contrast with the solid lines of real rays.

Because the rays are not actually present at the apparent location, and thus never really converge at any point, a virtual image cannot be projected onto a screen by putting it at the location of the virtual image. In contrast, a real image can be projected on the screen as it is formed by rays that converge on a real location. A real image can be projected onto a diffusely reflecting screen so people can see the image (the image on the screen plays as an object to be imaged by human eyes).

- Top: The formation of a virtual image using a diverging lens. Bottom: The formation of a virtual image using a convex mirror. In both diagrams, f is the focal point, O is the object, and I is the virtual image, shown in grey. Solid blue lines indicate (real) light rays and dashed blue lines indicate backward extension of the real rays.
  A plane mirror forms a virtual image positioned behind the mirror. Although the rays of light seem to come from behind the mirror, light from the source only exists in front of the mirror. The image in a plane mirror is not magnified (that is, the image is the same size as the object) and appears to be as far behind the mirror as the object is in front of the mirror.
- A diverging lens (one that is thicker at the edges than the middle) or a concave mirror forms a virtual image. Such an image is reduced in size when compared to the original object. A converging lens (one that is thicker in the middle than at the edges) or a convex mirror is also capable of producing a virtual image if the object is within the focal length. Such an image will be magnified. In contrast, an object placed in front of a converging lens or concave mirror at a position beyond the focal length produces a real image. Such an image will be magnified if the position of the object is within twice the focal length, or else the image will be reduced if the object is further than this distance.

== See also ==
- Focal plane
- Image plane
- Lens
- Erect image
