= Real image =

Collection of focus points made by converging light rays

Top: The formation of a real image using a convex lens. Bottom: The formation of a real image using a concave mirror. In both diagrams, f is the focal point, O is the object, and I is the image. Solid blue lines indicate light rays. It can be seen that the image is formed by actual light rays and thus can form a visible image on a screen placed at the position of the image.

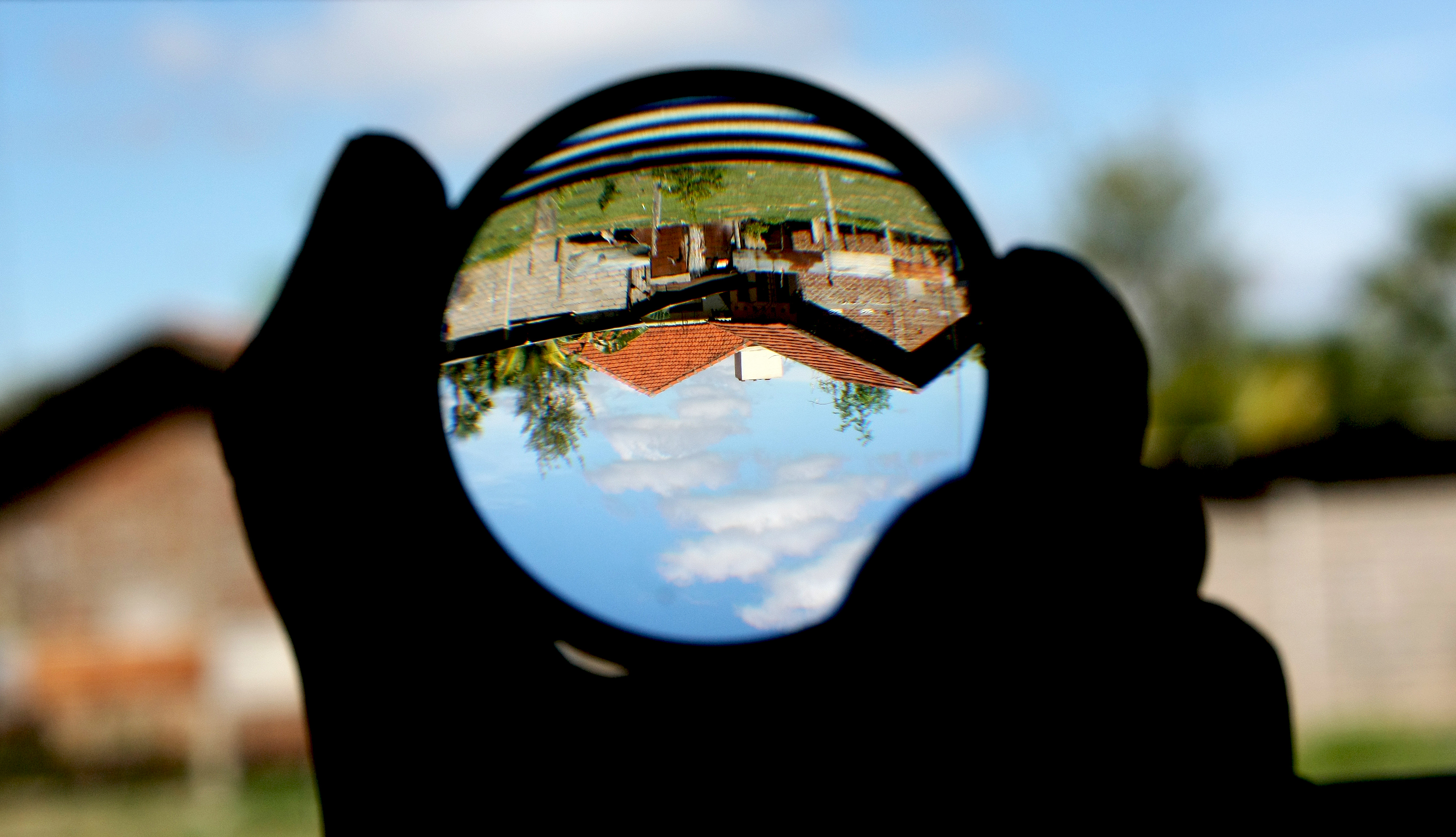
An inverted real image of distant house, formed by a convex lens, is viewed directly without being projected onto a screen.

Producing a real image. Each region of the detector or retina indicates the light produced by a corresponding region of the object.

In optics, an image is defined as the collection of focus points of light rays coming from an object. A real image is the collection of focus points actually made by converging/diverging rays, while a virtual image is the collection of focus points made by extensions of diverging or converging rays. In other words, a real image is an image which is located in the plane of convergence for the light rays that originate from a given object. Examples of real images include the image produced on a detector in the rear of a camera, and the image produced on an eyeball retina (the camera and eye focus light through an internal convex lens).

In simple terms, a real point image is formed when all the rays of light from a point object passing through an optical system converge at a single point and a virtual point image is formed when all the rays of light from a point object passing through an optical system seem to come from a single point.

In ray diagrams (such as the images on the right), real rays of light are always represented by full, solid lines; perceived or extrapolated rays of light are represented by dashed lines. A real image occurs at points where rays actually converge, whereas a virtual image occurs at points that rays appear to be diverging from.

Real images can be produced by concave mirrors and converging lenses, only if the object is placed further away from the mirror/lens than the focal point, and this real image is inverted. As the object approaches the focal point the image approaches infinity, and when the object passes the focal point the image becomes virtual and is not inverted (upright image). The distance is not the same as from the object to the lenses.

Real images may also be inspected by a second lens or lens system. This is the mechanism used by telescopes, binoculars and light microscopes. The objective lens gathers the light from the object and projects a real image within the structure of the optical instrument. A second lens or system of lenses, the eyepiece, then projects a second real image onto the retina of the eye.

== See also ==
- Focal plane
- Image plane
- Lens
- Erect image
