= Plane mirror =

Mirror with a flat reflecting surface

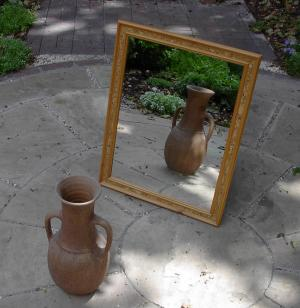
A plane mirror showing the virtual image of an urn nearby.

A diagram of an object in two plane mirrors that formed an angle bigger than 90 degrees, causing the object to have three reflections.

A plane mirror is a mirror with a flat (planar) reflective surface. For light rays striking a plane mirror, the angle of reflection equals the angle of incidence. The angle of the incidence is the angle between the incident ray and the surface normal (an imaginary line perpendicular to the surface). Therefore, the angle of reflection is the angle between the reflected ray and the normal and a collimated beam of light does not spread out after reflection from a plane mirror, except for diffraction effects.

A plane mirror makes an image of objects behind the mirror; these images appear to be behind the plane in which the mirror lies. A straight line drawn from part of an object to the corresponding part of its image makes a right angle with, and is bisected by, the surface of the plane mirror. The image formed by a plane mirror is a virtual (meaning that the light rays do not actually come from the image) and not a real image (meaning that the light rays do actually come from the image). The image is always upright, and of the same shape and size as the object it is reflecting. A virtual image is a copy of an object formed at the location from which the light rays appear to come.Images formed in plane mirrors are laterally inverted. For instance, if a person is reflected in a plane mirror, the image of his right hand appears to be the left hand of the image.

Plane mirrors are the only type of mirror for which an object produces an image that is virtual, erect and of the same size as the object in all cases irrespective of the shape, size and distance from mirror of the object however same is possible for other types of mirror (concave and convex) but only for a specific conditions. However the focal length of a plane mirror is infinity; its optical power is zero.

Using the mirror equation, where $d_0$ is the object distance, $d_i$ is the image distance, and $f$ is the focal length:

$$\frac{1}{d_0}+\frac{1}{d_i}=\frac{1}{f}$$

Since $[\frac{1}{f}=0]$,

$$\frac{1}{d_0}=-\frac{1}{d_i}$$

$$-d_0=d_i$$

Concave and Convex mirrors (spherical mirrors) are also able to produce images similar to a plane mirror. However, the images formed by them are not of the same size as the object like they are in a plane mirror in all conditions rather specific one . In a convex mirror, the virtual image formed is always diminished, whereas in a concave mirror when the object is placed between the focus and the pole, an enlarged virtual image is formed. Therefore, in applications where a virtual image of the same size is required, a plane mirror is preferred over spherical mirrors.

== Preparation ==
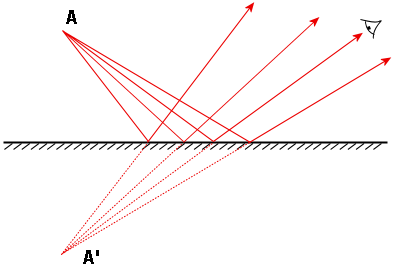
A ray diagram for a plane mirror. The incident light rays from the object create an apparent mirror image for the observer.

A plane mirror is made using some highly reflecting and polished surface such as a silver or aluminium surface in a process called silvering. After silvering, a thin layer of red lead oxide is applied at the back of the mirror. The reflecting surface reflects most of the light striking it as long as the surface remains uncontaminated by tarnishing or oxidation. Most modern plane mirrors are designed with a thin piece of plate glass that protects and strengthens the mirror surface and helps prevent tarnishing. Historically, mirrors were simply flat pieces of polished copper, obsidian, brass, or a precious metal. Mirrors made from liquid also exist, as the elements gallium and mercury are both highly reflective in their liquid state.

== Relation to curved mirrors ==
Mathematically, a plane mirror can be considered to be the limit of either a concave or a convex spherical curved mirror as the radius, and therefore the focal length becomes infinity.

== See also ==
- Geometrical optics
- Specular reflection
- Chinese magic mirror
- Law of reflection
