= Vergence (optics) =

Angle between converging or diverging light rays

Vergence of a beam. The vergence is inversely proportional to the distance from the focus in metres. If a (positive) lens is focussing the beam, it has to sit left of the focus, while a negative lens has to sit right of the focus to produce the appropriate vergence.

In optics, vergence is the angle formed by rays of light that are not perfectly parallel to one another. Rays that move closer to the optical axis as they propagate are said to be converging, while rays that move away from the axis are diverging. These imaginary rays are always perpendicular to the wavefront of the light, thus the vergence of the light is directly related to the radii of curvature of the wavefronts. A convex lens or concave mirror will cause parallel rays to focus, converging toward a point. Beyond that focal point, the rays diverge. Conversely, a concave lens or convex mirror will cause parallel rays to diverge.

Light does not actually consist of imaginary rays and light sources are not single-point sources, thus vergence is typically limited to simple ray modeling of optical systems. In a real system, the vergence is a product of the diameter of a light source, its distance from the optics, and the curvature of the optical surfaces. An increase in curvature causes an increase in vergence and a decrease in focal length, and the image or spot size (waist diameter) will be smaller. Likewise, a decrease in curvature decreases vergence, resulting in a longer focal length and an increase in image or spot diameter. This reciprocal relationship between vergence, focal length, and waist diameter are constant throughout an optical system, and is referred to as the optical invariant. A beam that is expanded to a larger diameter will have a lower degree of divergence, but if condensed to a smaller diameter the divergence will be greater.

The simple ray model fails for some situations, such as for laser light, where Gaussian beam analysis must be used instead.

== Definition ==
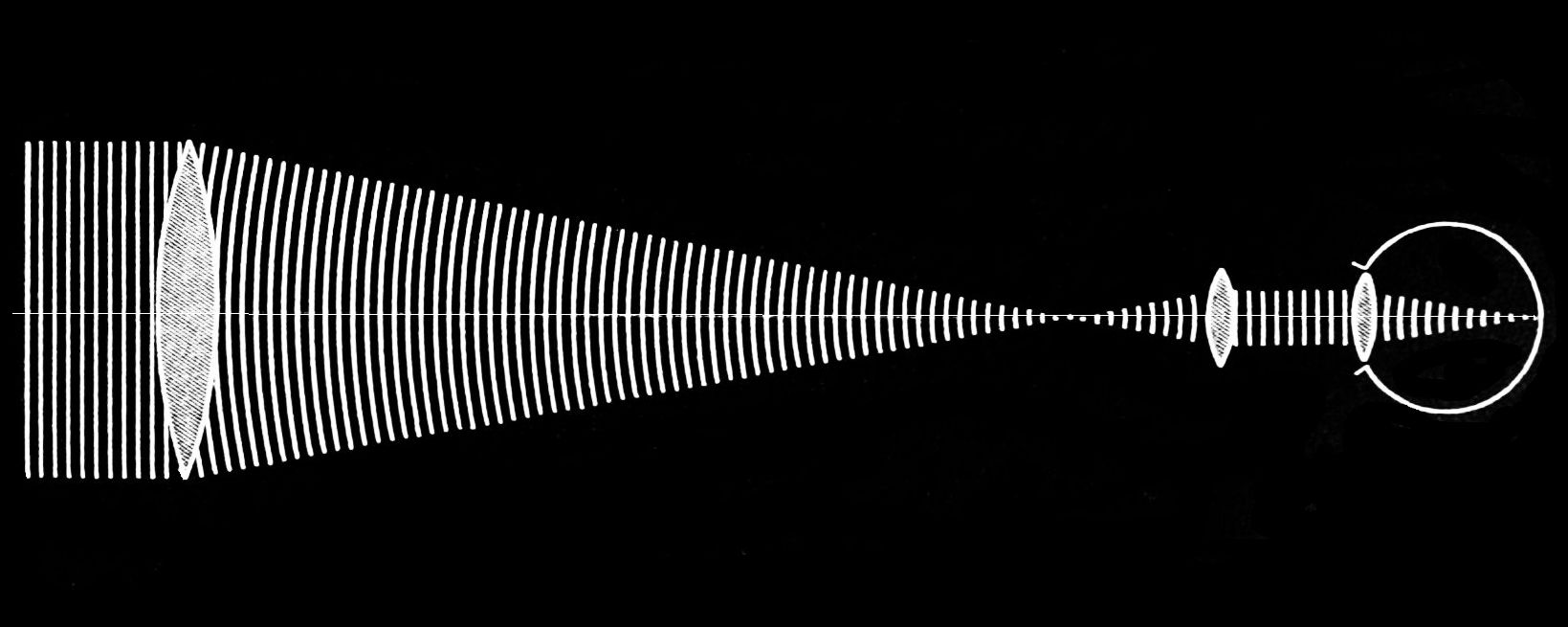
A simple telescope. Collimated (parallel) light waves converge through a lens, then diverge to be collimated by another lens, converging again through the lens of the eye.

In geometrical optics, vergence describes the curvature of optical wavefronts. Vergence is defined as

$$V = \frac{n}{r},$$

where n is the medium's refractive index and r is the distance from the point source to the wavefront. Vergence is measured in units of dioptres (D) which are equivalent to m^{−1}. This describes the vergence in terms of optical power. For optics like convex lenses, the converging point of the light exiting the lens is on the input side of the focal plane, and is positive in optical power. For concave lenses, the focal point is on the back side of the lens, or the output side of the focal plane, and is negative in power. A lens with no optical power is called an optical window, having flat, parallel faces. The optical power directly relates to how large positive images will be magnified, and how small negative images will be diminished.

All light sources produce some degree of divergence, as the waves exiting these sources always have some degree of curvature. At the proper distance, these waves can be straightened by use of a lens or mirror, creating collimated beams with minimal divergence, but some degree of divergence will remain, depending on the diameter of the beam versus the focal length. When the distance between the point source and wavefront becomes very large, the vergence goes to zero meaning that the wavefronts are planar and no longer have any detectable curvature. Light from distant stars have such a large radius that any curvature of the wavefronts are undetectable, and have no vergence.

The light can also be pictured as consisting of a bundle of lines radiating in the direction of propagation, which are always perpendicular to the wavefront, called "rays". These imaginary lines of infinitely small thicknesses are separated by only the angle between them. In ray tracing, the vergence can then be pictured as the angle between any two rays. For imaging or beams, the vergence is often described as the angle between the outermost rays in the bundle (marginal rays), at the edge (verge) of a cone of light, and the optical axis. This slope is typically measured in radians. Thus, in this case the convergence of the rays transmitted by a lens is equal to the radius of the light source divided by its distance from the optics. This limits the size of an image or the minimum spot diameter that can be produced by any focusing optics, which is determined by the reciprocal of that equation; the divergence of the light source multiplied by the distance. This relationship between vergence, focal length, and the minimum spot diameter (also called the "waist diameter") remains constant through all space, and is commonly referred to as the optical invariant.

This angular relationship becomes especially important with laser operations such as laser cutting or laser welding, as there is always a trade off between spot diameter, which affects the intensity of the energy, and the distance to the object. When low divergence in the beam is desired, then a larger diameter beam is necessary, but if a smaller beam is needed one must settle for greater divergence, and no change in the position of the lens will alter this. The only way to achieve a smaller spot is to use a lens with a shorter focal-length, or expand the beam to a larger diameter.

However, this measure of the curvature of wavefronts is only fully valid in geometrical optics, not in Gaussian beam optics or in wave optics, where the wavefront at the focus is wavelength-dependent and the curvature is not proportional to the distance from the focus. In this case, the diffraction of the light starts to play a very active role, often limiting the spot size to even larger diameters, especially in the far field. For non-circular light sources, the divergence may differ depending on the cross-sectional position of the rays from the optical axis. Diode lasers, for example, have greater divergence across the parallel direction (fast axis) than the perpendicular (slow axis), producing beams with rectangular profiles. This type of difference in divergence can be reduced by beam-shaping methods, such as using a rod lens that only affects divergence along a single cross-sectional direction.

== Convergence, divergence, and sign convention ==
Wavefronts propagating toward a single point yield positive vergence. This is also referred to as convergence since the wavefronts are all converging to the same point of focus. Contrarily, wavefronts propagating away from a single source point give way to negative vergence. Negative vergence is also called divergence.

== See also ==
- Optical power
- Optical resolution
- Cardinal point (optics)
