= Conjugate focal plane =

Concept in optics

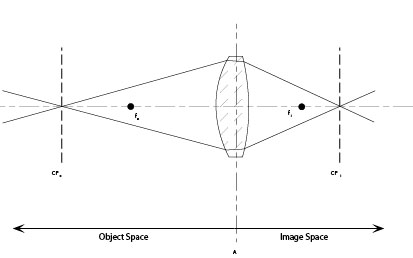
The object and corresponding image points can be interchanged. The object plane and the corresponding image plane are conjugate to each other.

In optics, a conjugate plane or conjugate focal plane of a given plane P, is the plane P′ such that points on P are imaged on P′. If an object is moved to the point occupied by its image, then the moved object's new image will appear at the point where the object originated. In other words, the object and its image are interchangeable. This comes from the principle of reversibility which states light rays will travel along the originating path if the light's direction is reversed. Depending on how an optical system is designed, there can be multiple planes that are conjugate to a specific plane (e.g. intermediate and final image planes for an object plane). The points that span conjugate planes are called conjugate points.

For a thin lens or a curved mirror, ${1 \over u} + {1 \over v} = { 1 \over f},$ where u is the distance from the object to the center of the lens or mirror, v is the distance from the lens or mirror to the image, and f is the focal length of the lens or mirror. Interchanging the object and image positions does not change the result of the formula.

In a telescope, the subject focal plane is at infinity and the conjugate image plane, at which the image sensor is placed, is said to be an infinite conjugate. In microscopy and macro photography, the subject is close to the lens, so the plane at which the image sensor is placed is said to be a finite conjugate. Within a system with relay lenses or eyepieces, there may be planes that are conjugate to the aperture.
