= Cardinal point (optics) =

Six points which determine imaging properties of an optical system

In Gaussian optics, the cardinal points consist of three pairs of points located on the optical axis of a rotationally symmetric, focal, optical system. These are the focal points, the principal points, and the nodal points; there are two of each. For ideal systems, the basic imaging properties such as image size, location, and orientation are completely determined by the locations of the cardinal points. For simple cases where the medium on both sides of an optical system is air or vacuum, four cardinal points are sufficient: the two focal points and either the principal points or the nodal points. The only ideal system that has been achieved in practice is a plane mirror, however the cardinal points are widely used to approximate the behavior of real optical systems. Cardinal points provide a way to analytically simplify an optical system with many components, allowing the imaging characteristics of the system to be approximately determined with simple calculations.

== Explanation ==
The cardinal points of a thick lens in air. F, F′ front and rear focal points; P, P′ front and rear principal points; V, V′ front and rear surface vertices.

The cardinal points lie on the optical axis of an optical system. Each point is defined by the effect the optical system has on rays that pass through that point, in the paraxial approximation. The paraxial approximation assumes that rays travel at shallow angles with respect to the optical axis, so that $\sin\theta\approx\theta$, $\tan\theta\approx\theta$, and $\cos\theta\approx 1$. Aperture effects are ignored: rays that do not pass through the aperture stop of the system are not considered in the discussion below.

=== Focal points and planes ===
The front focal point of an optical system, by definition, has the property that any ray that passes through it will emerge from the system parallel to the optical axis. The rear (or back) focal point of the system has the reverse property: rays that enter the system parallel to the optical axis are focused such that they pass through the rear focal point.

Rays that leave the object with the same angle cross at the back focal plane.

The front and rear (or back) focal planes are defined as the planes, perpendicular to the optic axis, which pass through the front and rear focal points. An object infinitely far from the optical system forms an image at the rear focal plane. For an object at a finite distance, the image is formed at a different location, but rays that leave the object parallel to one another cross at the rear focal plane.

Angle filtering with an aperture at the rear focal plane.

A diaphragm or "stop" at the rear focal plane of a lens can be used to filter rays by angle, since an aperture centred on the optical axis there will only pass rays that were emitted from the object at a sufficiently small angle from the optical axis. Using a sufficiently small aperture in the rear focal plane will make the lens object-space telecentric.

Similarly, the allowed range of angles on the output side of the lens can be filtered by putting an aperture at the front focal plane of the lens (or a lens group within the overall lens), and a sufficiently small aperture will make the lens image-space telecentric. This is important for DSLR cameras having CCD sensors. The pixels in these sensors are more sensitive to rays that hit them straight on than to those that strike at an angle. A lens that does not control the angle of incidence at the detector will produce pixel vignetting in the images.

=== Principal planes and points ===
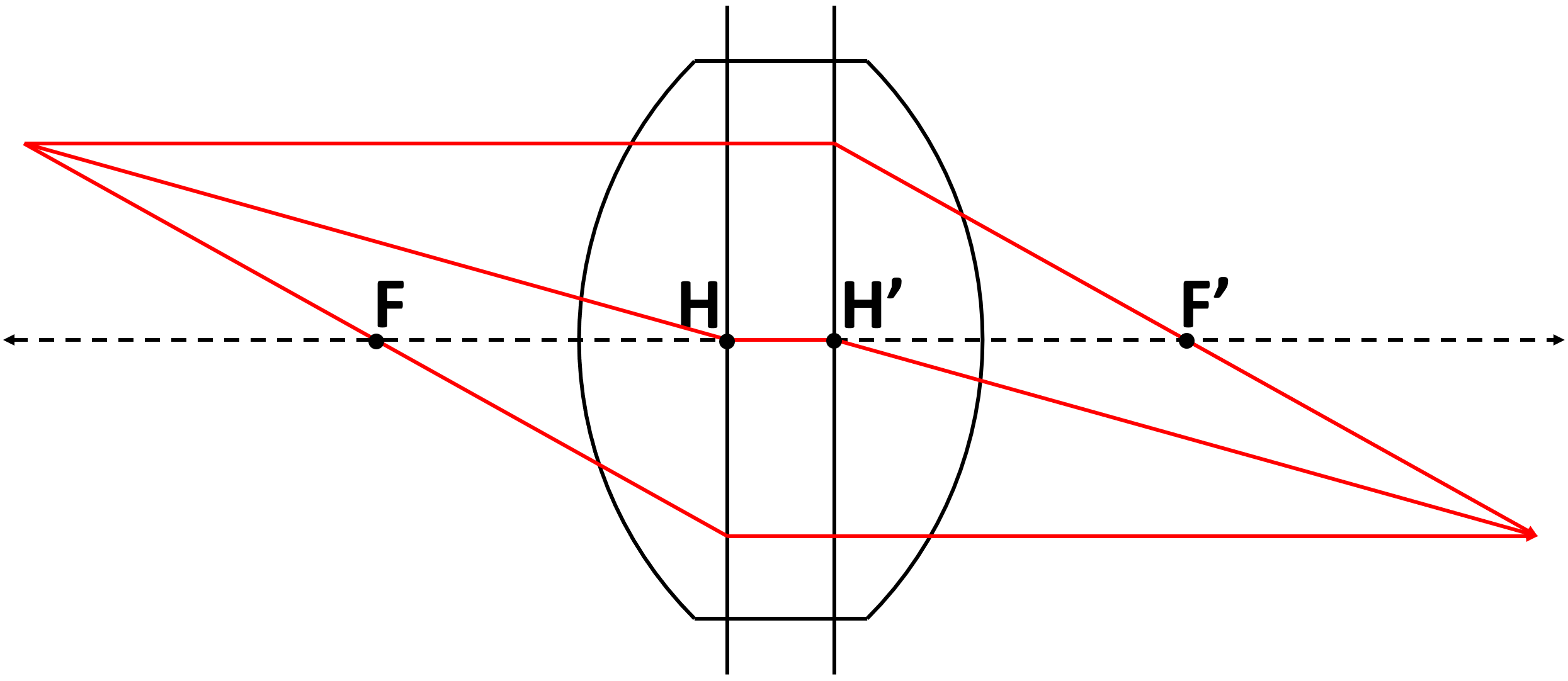
Principal planes of a thick lens. The principal points H and H′ and front and rear focal points F and F′ are marked.

Various lens shapes, and the location of the principal planes for each. The radii of curvature of the lens surfaces are indicated as r_{1} and r_{2}.

The two principal planes of a lens have the property that a ray emerging from the lens appears to have crossed the rear principal plane at the same distance from the optical axis that the ray appeared to have crossed the front principal plane, as viewed from the front of the lens. This means that the lens can be treated as if all of the refraction happened at the principal planes, and rays travel parallel to the optical axis between the planes. (Linear magnification between the principal planes is +1.) The principal planes are crucial in defining the properties of an optical system, since the magnification of the system is determined by the distance from an object to the front principal plane and the distance from the rear principal plane to the object's image. The principal points are the points where the principal planes cross the optical axis.

If the medium surrounding an optical system has a refractive index of 1 (e.g., air or vacuum), then the distance from each principal plane to the corresponding focal point is just the focal length of the system. In the more general case, the distance to the foci is the focal length multiplied by the index of refraction of the medium.

For a single lens surrounded by a medium of refractive index n = 1, the locations of the principal points H and H′ with respect to the respective lens vertices are given by the formulas
$$\begin{aligned}
H &= - \frac{f(n - 1)d}{r_2 n} \\
H' &= - \frac{f(n - 1)d}{r_1 n} ,\end{aligned}$$
where f is the focal length of the lens, d is its thickness, and r_{1} and r_{2} are the radii of curvature of its surfaces. Positive signs indicate distances to the right of the corresponding vertex, and negative to the left.

For a thin lens in air, the principal planes both lie at the location of the lens. The point where they cross the optical axis is sometimes misleadingly called the optical centre of the lens. For a real lens the principal planes do not necessarily pass through the centre of the lens and can even be outside the lens.

=== Nodal points ===
N, N′ The front and rear nodal points of a thick lens.

The front and rear nodal points of a lens have the property that a ray aimed at one of them will be refracted by the lens such that it appears to have come from the other with the same angle to the optical axis. (Angular magnification between nodal points is +1.) The nodal points therefore do for angles what the principal planes do for transverse distance. If the medium on both sides of an optical system is the same (e.g., air or vacuum), then the front and rear nodal points coincide with the front and rear principal points, respectively.

Gauss's original 1841 paper only discussed the main rays through the focal points. A colleague, Johann Listing, was the first to describe the nodal points in 1845 to evaluate the human eye, where the image is in fluid. The cardinal points were all included in a single diagram as early as 1864 (Donders), with the object in air and the image in a different medium.

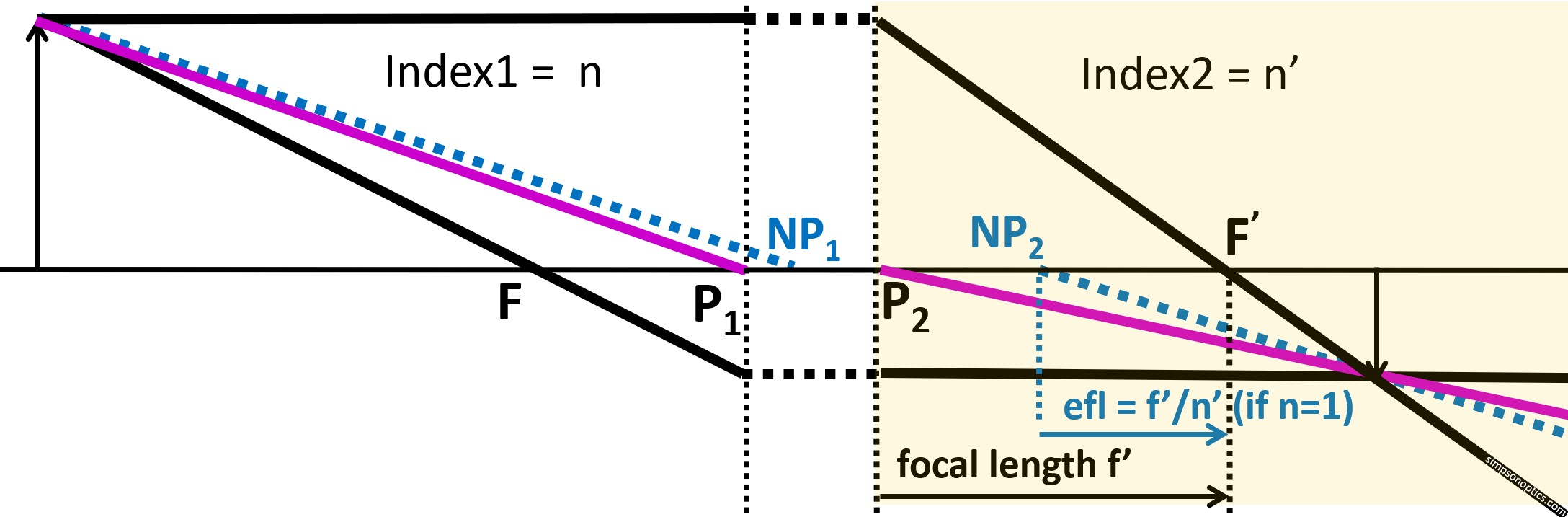
Cardinal point diagram for an optical system with different media on each side. F for Focal point, P for Principal point, NP for Nodal Point, and efl for effective focal length. The chief ray is shown in purple

The nodal points characterize a ray that goes through the centre of a lens without any angular deviation. For a lens in air with the aperture stop at the principal planes, this would be a chief ray since the nodal points and principal points coincide in this case. This is a valuable addition in its own right to what has come to be called "Gaussian optics", and if the image was in fluid instead, then that same ray would refract into the new medium, as it does in the diagram to the right. A ray through the nodal points has parallel input and output portions (blue). A simple method to find the rear nodal point for a lens with air on one side and fluid on the other is to take the rear focal length f′ and divide it by the image medium index, which gives the effective focal length (EFL) of the lens. The EFL is the distance from the rear nodal point to the rear focal point.

The power of a lens is equal to 1/EFL or n′/f′. For collimated light, a lens could be placed in air at the second nodal point of an optical system to give the same paraxial properties as an original lens system with an image in fluid. The power of the entire eye is about 60 dioptres, for example. Similarly, a lens used totally in fluid, like an intraocular lens, has the same definition for power, with an average value of about 21 dioptres.

==== Nodal points and the eye ====
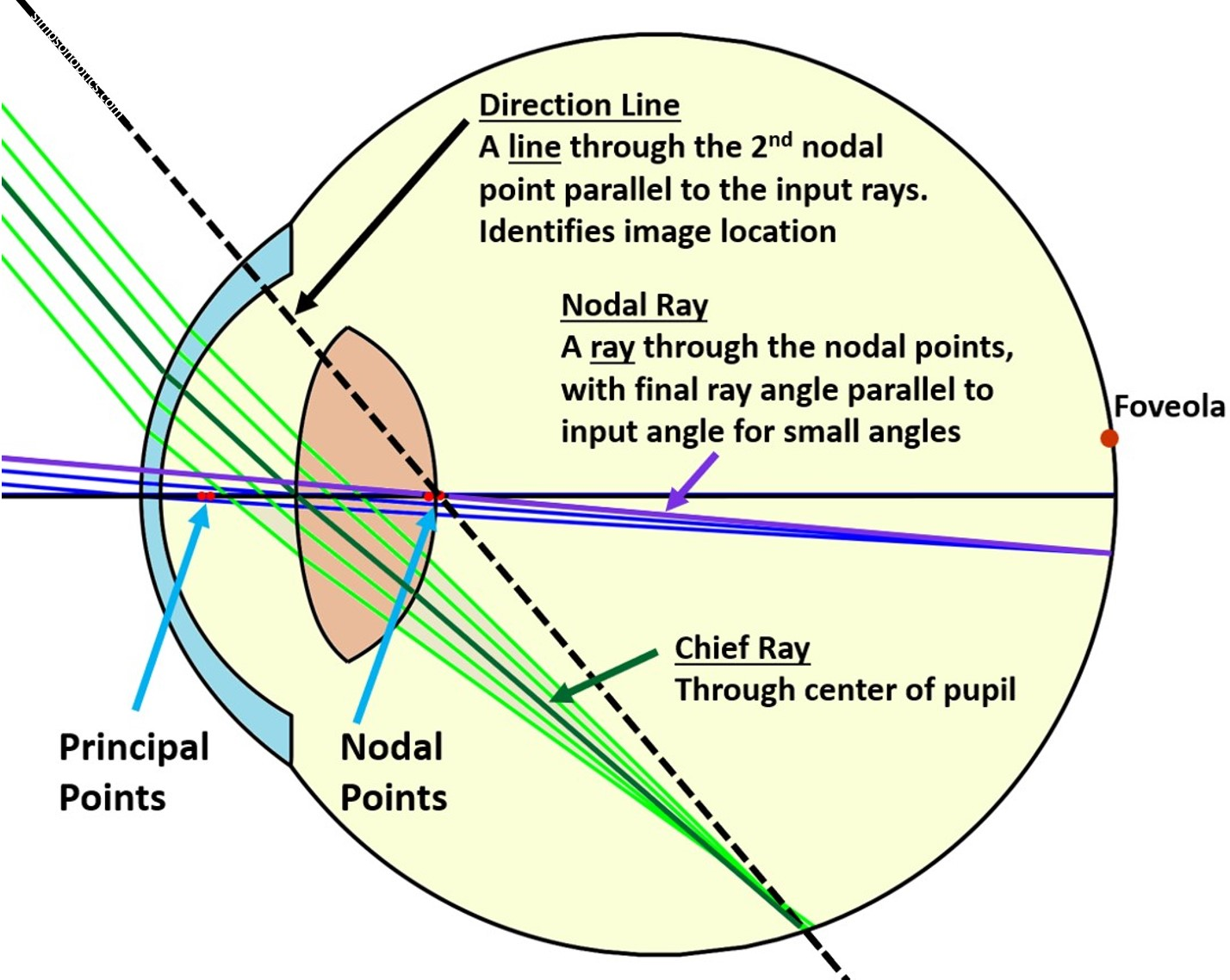
Use of the nodal point in analysis of the eye

The eye itself has a second special use of the nodal point that tends to be obscured by paraxial discussions. The cornea and retina are highly curved, unlike most imaging systems, and the optical design of the eye has the property that a "direction line" that is parallel to the input rays can be used to find the magnification or to scale retinal locations. This line passes approximately through the 2nd nodal point, but rather than being an actual paraxial ray, it identifies the image formed by ray bundles that pass through the centre of the pupil. The terminology comes from Volkmann in 1836, but most discussions incorrectly imply that paraxial properties of rays extend to very large angles, rather than recognizing this as a unique property of the eye's design. This scaling property is well-known, very useful, and very simple: angles drawn with a ruler centred on the posterior pole of the lens on a cross-section of the eye can approximately scale the retina over more than an entire hemisphere. It is only in the 2000s that the limitations of this approximation have become apparent, with an exploration into why some intraocular lens (IOL) patients see dark shadows in the far periphery (negative dysphotopsia, which is probably due to the IOL being much smaller than the natural lens.)

==== Optical center ====
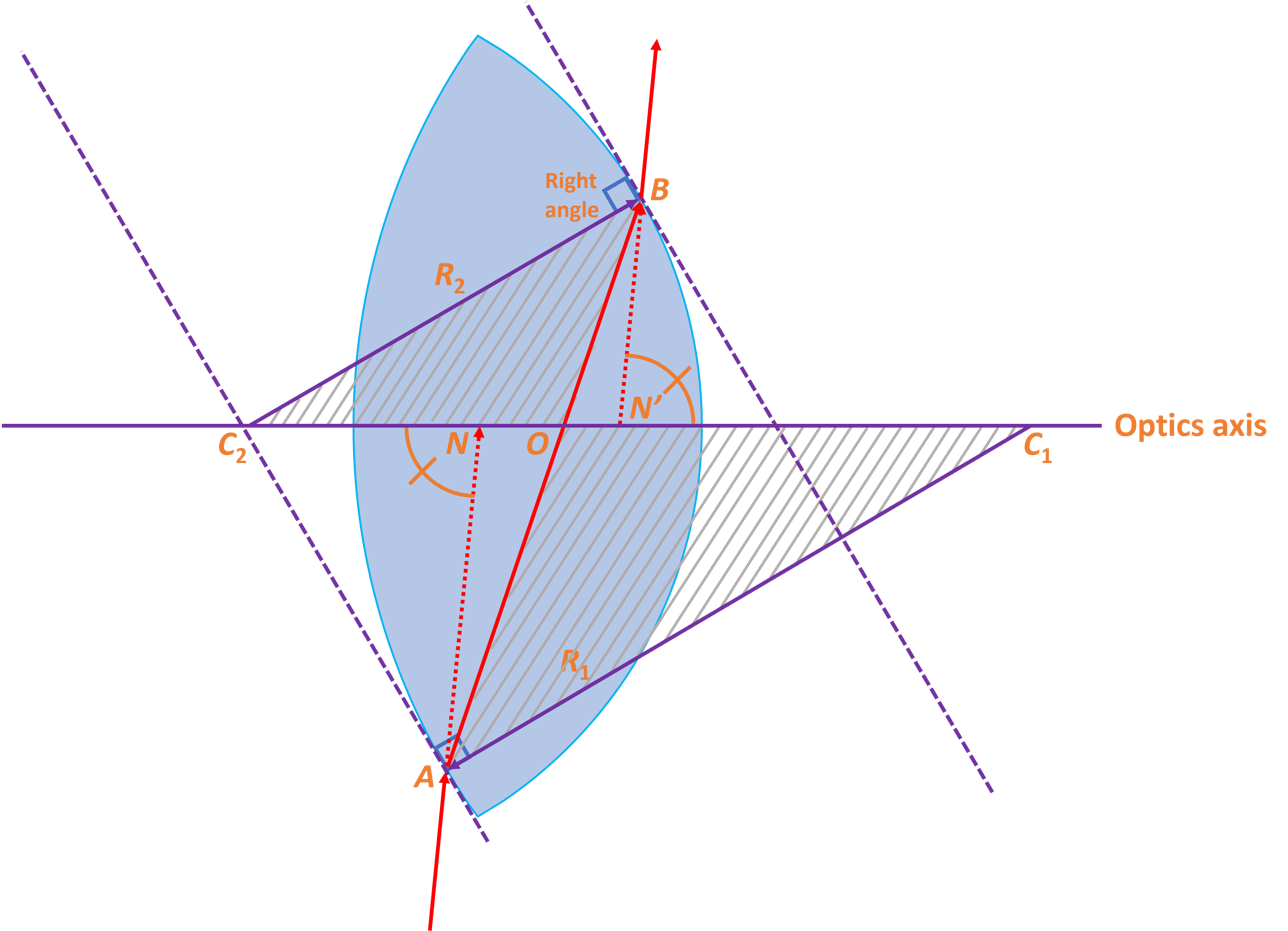
A diagram showing how to find the optical center O of a spherical lens. N and N' are the lens's nodal points.

The optical center of a spherical lens is a point such that if a ray passes through it, the ray's path after leaving the lens will be parallel to the ray's path before the ray entered the lens.

In the figure at right, the points A and B are chosen such that lines from the centers of curvature C_{1} and C_{2} to the spherical lens surfaces are parallel to one another. The dashed lines tangent to the surfaces at A and B are therefore also parallel. The ray aiming to the front nodal point N of the lens will exit the lens with the same angle at which it entered the lens, and it can be shown that it exits the lens at B according to Snell's law. As a result, the triangles OBC_{2} and OAC_{1} are similar (i.e., their angles are the same), $\frac{R_2}{\overline{O C_2}} = \frac{R_1}{\overline{O C_1}} \rightarrow \frac{R_2}{R_1} = \frac{\overline{O C_2}}{\overline{O C_1}}$. For a spherical lens, the radii of curvatures $R_1$ and $R_2$ and the curvature center locations $C_1$ and $C_2$ do not depend on the choice of A (and B). Therefore, the optical center location O, defined by the ratio $\frac{\overline{O C_2}}{\overline{O C_1}} = \frac{R_2}{R_1}$ on the optical axis, is fixed for a given lens.

==== Photography ====
The nodal points are widely misunderstood in photography, where it is commonly asserted that the light rays "intersect" at "the nodal point", that the iris diaphragm of the lens is located there, and that this is the correct pivot point for panoramic photography, so as to avoid parallax error. These claims generally arise from confusion about the optics of camera lenses, as well as confusion between the nodal points and the other cardinal points of the system. A better choice of the point about which to pivot a camera for panoramic photography can be shown to be the centre of the system's entrance pupil. On the other hand, swing-lens cameras with fixed film position rotate the lens about the rear nodal point to stabilize the image on the film.

=== Surface vertices ===
In optics, surface vertices are the points where each optical surface crosses the optical axis. They are important primarily because they are physically measurable parameters for the optical element positions, and so the positions of the cardinal points of the optical system must be known with respect to the surface vertices to describe the system.

In anatomy, the surface vertices of the eye's lens are called the anterior and posterior poles of the lens.

== Modeling optical systems as mathematical transformations ==
In geometrical optics, for each object ray entering an optical system, a single and unique image ray exits from the system. In mathematical terms, the optical system performs a transformation that maps every object ray to an image ray. The object ray and its associated image ray are said to be conjugate to each other. This term also applies to corresponding pairs of object and image points and planes. The object and image rays, points, and planes are considered to be in two distinct optical spaces, object space and image space; additional intermediate optical spaces may be used as well.

=== Rotationally symmetric optical systems; optical axis, axial points, and meridional planes ===
An optical system is rotationally symmetric if its imaging properties are unchanged by any rotation about some axis. This (unique) axis of rotational symmetry is the optical axis of the system. Optical systems can be folded using plane mirrors; the system is still considered to be rotationally symmetric if it possesses rotational symmetry when unfolded. Any point on the optical axis (in any space) is an axial point.

Rotational symmetry greatly simplifies the analysis of optical systems, which otherwise must be analyzed in three dimensions. Rotational symmetry allows the system to be analyzed by considering only rays confined to a single transverse plane containing the optical axis. Such a plane is called a meridional plane; it is a cross-section through the system.

=== Ideal, rotationally symmetric, optical imaging system ===
An ideal, rotationally symmetric, optical imaging system must meet three criteria:

1. All rays "originating" from each object point converge to a single and unique image point; imaging is stigmatic.
2. Object planes perpendicular to the optical axis are conjugate to image planes perpendicular to the axis.
3. The image of an object confined to a plane normal to the axis is geometrically similar to the object.

In some optical systems imaging is stigmatic for one or perhaps a few object points, but to be an ideal system imaging must be stigmatic for every object point. In an ideal system, every object point maps to a different image point.

Unlike rays in mathematics, optical rays extend to infinity in both directions. Rays are real when they are in the part of the optical system to which they apply, and are virtual elsewhere. For example, object rays are real on the object side of the optical system, while image rays are real on the image side of the system. In stigmatic imaging, an object ray intersecting any specific point in object space must be conjugate to an image ray intersecting the conjugate point in image space. A consequence is that every point on an object ray is conjugate to some point on the conjugate image ray.

Geometrical similarity implies the image is a scale model of the object. There is no restriction on the image's orientation; the image may be inverted or otherwise rotated with respect to the object.

=== Focal and afocal systems, focal points ===
Afocal systems have no focal points, principal points, or nodal points. In such systems an object ray parallel to the optical axis is conjugate to an image ray parallel to the optical axis. A system is focal if an object ray parallel to the axis is conjugate to an image ray that intersects the optical axis. The intersection of the image ray with the optical axis is the focal point F′ in image space. Focal systems also have an axial object point F such that any ray through F is conjugate to an image ray parallel to the optical axis. F is the object space focal point of the system.

=== Transformation ===
The transformation between object space and image space is completely defined by the cardinal points of the system, and these points can be used to map any point on the object to its conjugate image point.

== See also ==
- Film plane
- Pinhole camera model
- Radius of curvature (optics)
- Vergence (optics)
