= Thin lens =

Lens with a thickness that is negligible

A lens may be considered a thin lens if its thickness is much less than the radii of curvature of its surfaces (d ≪ |R_{1}| and d ≪ |R_{2}|).

In optics, a thin lens is a lens with a thickness (distance along the optical axis between the two surfaces of the lens) that is negligible compared to the radii of curvature of the lens surfaces. Lenses whose thickness is not negligible are sometimes called thick lenses.

The thin lens approximation ignores optical effects due to the thickness of lenses and simplifies ray tracing calculations. It is often combined with the paraxial approximation in techniques such as ray transfer matrix analysis.

== Focal length ==
The focal length, f, of a lens in air is given by the lensmaker's equation:

$$\frac{1}{f} = (n-1) \left[ \frac{1}{R_1} - \frac{1}{R_2} + \frac{(n-1)d}{n R_1 R_2} \right],$$

where n is the index of refraction of the lens material, R_{1} and R_{2} are the radii of curvature of the two surfaces, and d is the thickness of the lens. Here R_{1} is taken to be positive if the first surface is convex, and negative if the surface is concave. The signs are reversed for the back surface of the lens: R_{2} is positive if the surface is concave, and negative if it is convex. This is an arbitrary sign convention; some authors choose different signs for the radii, which changes the equation for the focal length.

For a thin lens, d is much smaller than one of the radii of curvature (either R_{1} or R_{2}). In these conditions, the last term of the Lensmaker's equation becomes negligible, and the focal length of a thin lens in air can be approximated by

$$\frac{1}{f} \approx \left(n-1\right)\left[ \frac{1}{R_1} - \frac{1}{R_2} \right].$$

=== Derivation using Snell's law ===
Refraction of a thin planoconvex lens

Consider a thin lens with a first surface of radius $R$ and a flat rear surface, made of material with index of refraction $n$.

Applying Snell's law, light entering the first surface is refracted according to $\sin i = n \sin r_1$, where $i$ is the angle of incidence on the interface and $r_1$ is the angle of refraction.

For the second surface, $n \sin r_2 = \sin e$, where $r_2$ is the angle of incidence and $e$ is the angle of refraction.

For small angles, $\sin x \approx x$. The geometry of the problem then gives:

$$\begin{align}
e &\approx n r_2 \\
&= n (i - r_1)\\
&\approx n (i - \frac in)
\end{align}$$

Focusing by a thin planoconvex lens

If the incoming ray is parallel to the optical axis and distance $h$ from it, then
$$\sin i = \frac hR \implies i \approx \frac hR.$$

Substituting into the expression above, one gets
$$e \approx \frac {h}{R} (n-1).$$

This ray crosses the optical axis at distance $f$, given by
$$\tan e = \frac hf \implies e \approx \frac hf$$

Combining the two expressions gives $\frac 1f = \frac 1R (n - 1)$.

It can be shown that if two such lenses of radii $R_1$ and $-R_2$ are placed close together, the inverses of the focal lengths can be added up giving the thin lens formula:

$$\frac 1f = \left(n-1\right)\left( \frac 1{R_1} - \frac 1{R_2} \right)$$

== Image formation ==
Thin lens ray rules

Certain rays follow simple rules when passing through a thin lens, in the paraxial ray approximation:

- Any ray that enters parallel to the axis on one side of the lens proceeds towards the focal point $f_2$ on the other side (red in figure).
- Any ray that arrives at the lens after passing through the focal point $f_1$ on the front side, comes out parallel to the axis on the other side (blue).
- Any ray that passes through the center of the lens will not change its direction (green).

If three such rays are traced from the same point on an object in front of the lens (such as the top), their intersection will mark the location of the corresponding point on the image of the object. By following the paths of these rays, the relationship between the object distance s_{o} and the image distance s_{i} (these distances are with respect to the lens) can be shown to be

$${1\over s_o} + {1\over s_i} = {1\over f}$$

which is known as the Gaussian thin-lens equation. The Gaussian thin-lens equation has a sign convention described as follows:

Sign convention for Gaussian lens equation
Parameter	Meaning	+ Sign	− Sign
s_{o}	The distance between an object and a lens.	Real object	Virtual object
s_{i}	The distance between an image and a lens.	Real image	Virtual image
f	The focal length of a lens.	Converging lens	Diverging lens
y_{o}	The height of an object from the optical axis.	Erect object	Inverted object
y_{i}	The height of an image from the optical axis	Erect image	Inverted image
M_{T}	The transverse magnification in imaging (= the ratio of y_{i} to y_{o}).	Image upright as object	Image inverted to object

Plots of image distance s_{i} and magnification M_{T} vs object distance s_{o} for the Gaussian lens equation – the dashed curve denotes a virtual image

Plots of image distance s_{i}, and magnification M_{T} vs object distance s_{o} are rectangular hyperbolas with the vertical asymptote being s_{o} = f, and the horizontal asymptote being s_{i} = f and M_{T} = 0, respectively. Their positive and negative branches denote the real and virtual images, respectively.

There are other sign conventions such as the Cartesian sign convention where the thin lens equation is written as
$${1\over s_o} + {1\over f} = {1\over s_i}.$$
For a thick lens, the same form of lens equation is applicable with the modification that the image and object distances are measured from the principal planes of the lens.

== Physical optics ==
In scalar wave optics, a lens is a part which shifts the phase of the wavefront. Mathematically this can be understood as a multiplication of the wavefront with the following function:

$$\exp\left(\frac{2\pi i}{\lambda} \frac{r^2}{2f}\right)$$.
