= Conic constant =

Parameter describing conic sections

An illustration of various conic constants

In geometry, the conic constant (or Schwarzschild constant, after Karl Schwarzschild) is a quantity describing conic sections, and is represented by the letter K. The constant is given by
$$K = -e^2,$$
where e is the eccentricity of the conic section.

The equation for a conic section with apex at the origin and tangent to the y axis is
$$y^2-2Rx+(K+1)x^2 = 0$$

or alternately
$$x = \dfrac{y^2}{R+\sqrt{R^2-(K+1)y^2}}$$

where R is the radius of curvature at x = 0.

This formulation is used in geometric optics to specify oblate elliptical (K > 0), spherical (K = 0), prolate elliptical (0 > K > −1), parabolic (K = −1), and hyperbolic (K < −1) lens and mirror surfaces. When the paraxial approximation is valid, the optical surface can be treated as a spherical surface with the same radius.
