= Vergence (disambiguation) =

Vergence may refer to:

- Vergence, the simultaneous movement of both eyes in opposite directions, needed for binocular vision
- Vergence (optics), the reciprocal of the distance between the point of focus and a reference plane
- Vergence (geology), a property of deformed rock
- Force vergence, a fictional phenomenon in the Star Wars TV series The Acolyte
