= Gaussian optics =

Technique in geometric optics

Gaussian optics is a technique in geometrical optics that describes the behaviour of light rays in optical systems using the paraxial approximation, in which only rays that make small angles with the optical axis of the system are considered. In this approximation, the trigonometric relations governing propagation and refraction are linearized, so that simple formulae can be obtained for quantities such as focal length, image position, magnification, and brightness.

Gaussian optics is named after mathematician and physicist Carl Friedrich Gauss, who showed that a centered optical system can be characterized by a set of cardinal points, from which its first-order optical properties may be determined. In modern terms, Gaussian optics may be viewed as the linearization of the Hamiltonian dynamics of light rays near the optical axis.

== Matrix formulation ==
Gaussian optics can be interpreted as a linear approximation to the dynamics of light rays in a phase space of position and direction, transverse to the axis. Working in a simple two-dimensional model, a ray near the optical axis can be specified by its height $q$ and the angle $\theta$ it makes with the parallel to the axis. A variable $p=n\theta$ plays the role of conjugate momentum, where $n$ is the refractive index of the optical medium. The pair $(q,p)$ then serve as coordinates on a two-dimensional phase space.

The propagation of rays through a medium is described, to first order, by a linear transformation

$$\begin{pmatrix} q_2 \\ p_2 \end{pmatrix}
= M \begin{pmatrix} q_1 \\ p_1 \end{pmatrix},$$

where $M$ is a $2\times 2$ matrix. For systems in the paraxial approximation, this matrix preserves the canonical form $d q\wedge d p$, and is therefore a symplectic matrix. In one transverse direction, this is equivalent to $\det M = 1$.

For example, propagation in a medium of refractive index $n$, through a geometric length $L$, with refraction generated by a thin lens of focal length $f$ is represented by the matrix
$$M = \begin{pmatrix} 1 & L/n \\ 0 & 1\end{pmatrix}\begin{pmatrix}1 & 0\\ -1/f & 1\end{pmatrix}.$$
The first matrix is where the paraxial approximation is most visible: a free paraxial ray satisfies $q_2=q_1+L\tan\theta_1\approx q_1+L\theta_1 = q_1 + Lp_1/n.$ The effect of the second matrix can be understood by taking $L=0$ and $(q_1,p_1)=(f,1)$, so that the initial height is $f$ and initial angle is $\theta_1=1/n$. Then the output height is the same (no distance is traveled from the lens), and $p_2=0$. So $\theta_2=0$, and the effect of the lens is to straighten this particular ray.

A system with multiple lenses can be modeled by multiplying together matrices representing the lenses and the spaces between them in order. A thick lens can be modeled by multiplying together a matrix representing the refraction at the lens's first surface, a matrix representing propagation through the glass, and a matrix representing refraction at the second surface.
