= Curve radius =

- Radius of curvature, the reciprocal of the curvature in differential geometry
- Minimum railway curve radius, the shortest allowable design radius for the centerline of railway tracks
