= Center of curvature =

Center of the circle which best approximates a curve at a given point

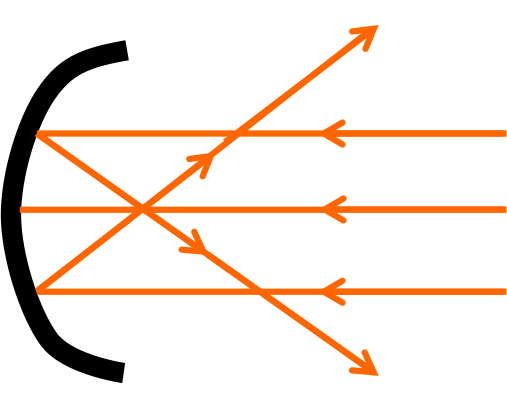
A concave mirror with light rays

Center of curvature

In geometry, the center of curvature of a curve is a point located at a distance from the curve equal to the radius of curvature lying on the curve normal vector. It is the point at infinity if the curvature is zero. The osculating circle to the curve is centered at the centre of curvature. Cauchy defined the center of curvature C as the intersection point of two infinitely close normal lines to the curve. The locus of centers of curvature for each point on the curve comprise the evolute of the curve. This term is generally used in physics regarding the study of lenses and mirrors (see radius of curvature (optics)).

It lies on the principal axis of a mirror or lens. In case of a convex mirror it lies behind the polished, or reflecting, surface and it lies in front of the reflecting surface in case of a concave mirror.

== See also ==
- Curvature
- Differential geometry of curves
