= Focus (optics) =

Point at which light rays converge

Eye focusing ideally collects all light rays from a point on an object into a corresponding point on the retina.

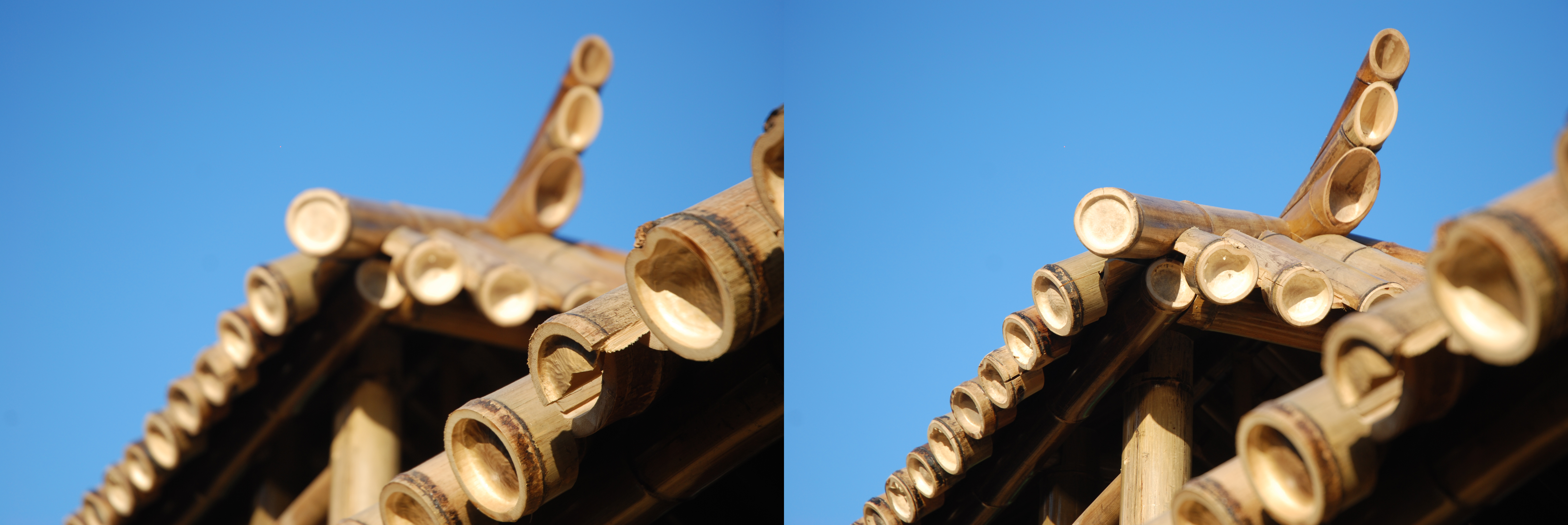
A demonstration of camera focus on different distances, showing a bamboo rooftop

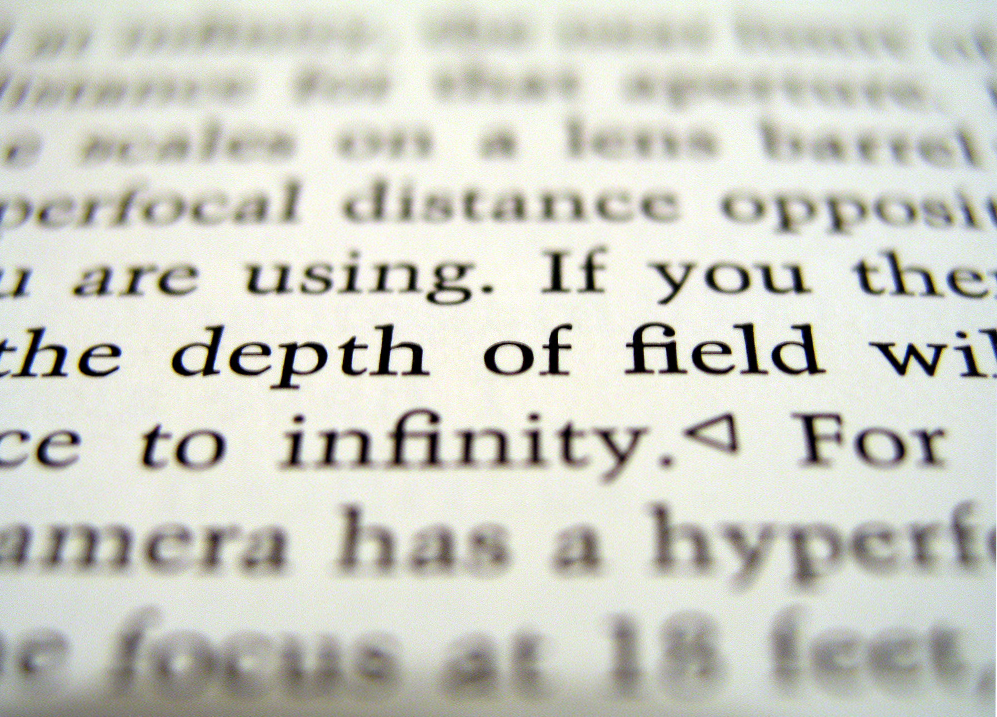
Text on a page that is partially in focus, but mostly not in varying degrees

In geometrical optics, a focus, also called an image point, is a point where light rays originating from a point on an object converge. Although the focus is conceptually a point, physically the focus has a spatial extent, called the blur circle. This non-ideal focusing may be caused by aberrations of the imaging optics. Even in the absence of aberrations, the smallest possible blur circle is the Airy disc caused by diffraction from the optical system's aperture; diffraction is the ultimate limit to the light focusing ability of any optical system. Aberrations tend to worsen as the aperture diameter increases, while the Airy circle is smallest for large apertures.

An image, or image point or region, is in focus if light from object points is converged almost as much as possible in the image, and out of focus if light is not well converged. The border between these is sometimes defined using a "circle of confusion" criterion.

A principal focus or focal point is a special focus:

- For a lens, or a spherical or parabolic mirror, it is a point onto which collimated light parallel to the axis is focused. Since light can pass through a lens in either direction, a lens has two focal points – one on each side. The distance in air from the lens or mirror's principal plane to the focus is called the focal length.
- Elliptical mirrors have two focal points: light that passes through one of these before striking the mirror is reflected such that it passes through the other.
- The focus of a hyperbolic mirror is either of two points which have the property that light from one is reflected as if it came from the other.

Diverging (negative) lenses and convex mirrors do not focus a collimated beam to a point. Instead, the focus is the point from which the light appears to be emanating, after it travels through the lens or reflects from the mirror. A convex parabolic mirror will reflect a beam of collimated light to make it appear as if it were radiating from the focal point, or conversely, reflect rays directed toward the focus as a collimated beam. A convex elliptical mirror will reflect light directed towards one focus as if it were radiating from the other focus, both of which are behind the mirror. A convex hyperbolic mirror will reflect rays emanating from the focal point in front of the mirror as if they were emanating from the focal point behind the mirror. Conversely, it can focus rays directed at the focal point that is behind the mirror towards the focal point that is in front of the mirror as in a Cassegrain telescope.

== See also ==
- Autofocus
- Cardinal point (optics)
- Defocus aberration
- Depth of field
- Depth of focus
- Far point
- Focus (geometry)
- Fixed focus
- Bokeh
- Focus stacking
- Focal plane
- Manual focus
