= Toroidal reflector =

Type of reflecting telescope

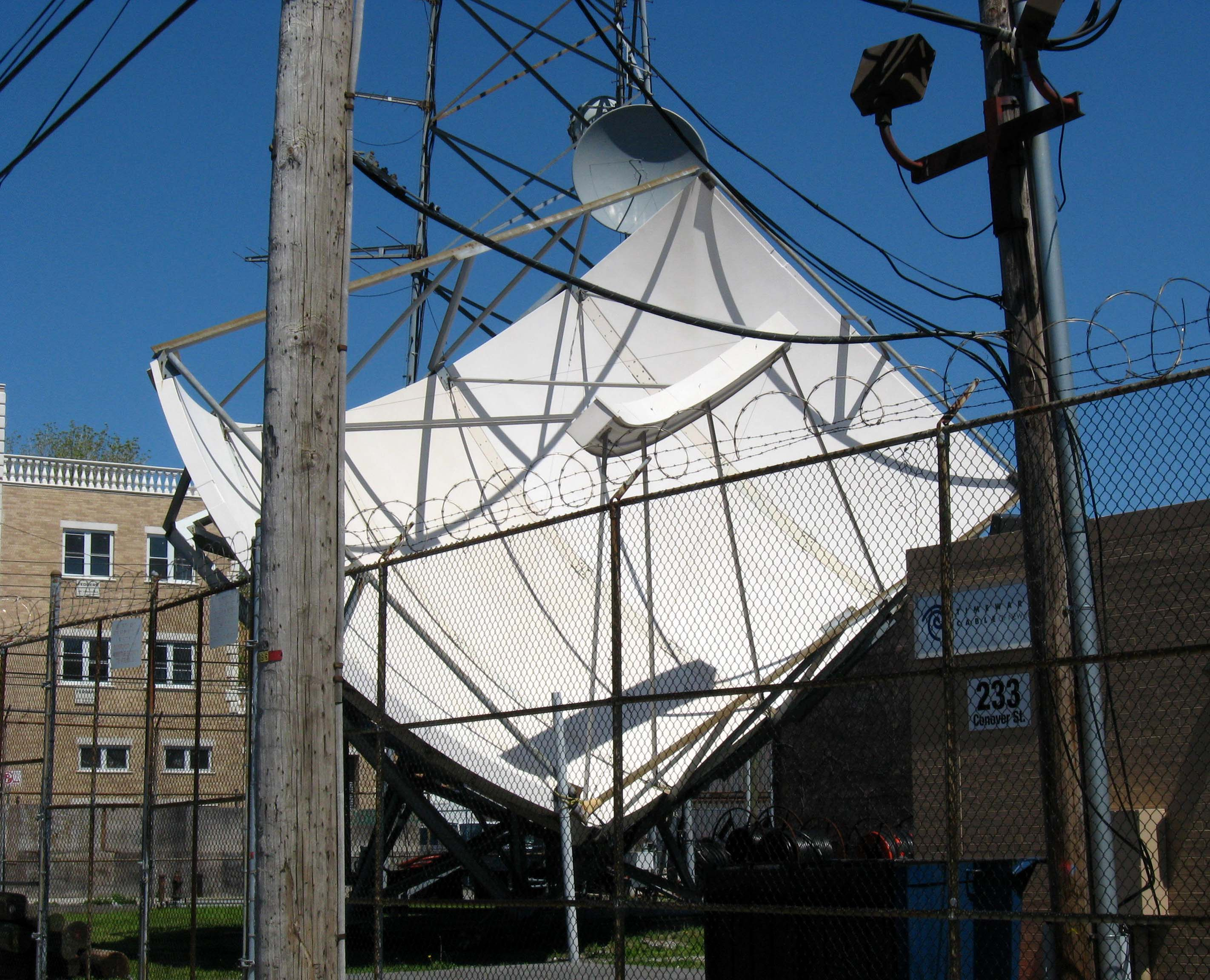
Toroidal satellite antenna

A toroidal mirror is a reflector whose surface is a section of a torus, defined by two radii of curvature. Such reflectors are easier to manufacture than mirrors with a surface described by a paraboloid or ellipsoid. They suffer from spherical aberration and coma, but do not suffer from astigmatism like a spherical mirror when used in an off-axis geometry, provided the angle of incidence is matched to the design angle. Because they are easier to manufacture, they are much cheaper than ellipsoidal or paraboloidal mirrors for the same surface quality.

Toroidal mirrors are used in Yolo telescopes and optical monochromators. In these devices, the source and detectors of the light are not located on the optical axis of the mirror, so the use of a true paraboloid of revolution would cause a distorted image.

== See also ==
- List of telescope types
