= Distorting mirror =

Attraction that uses curved mirrors

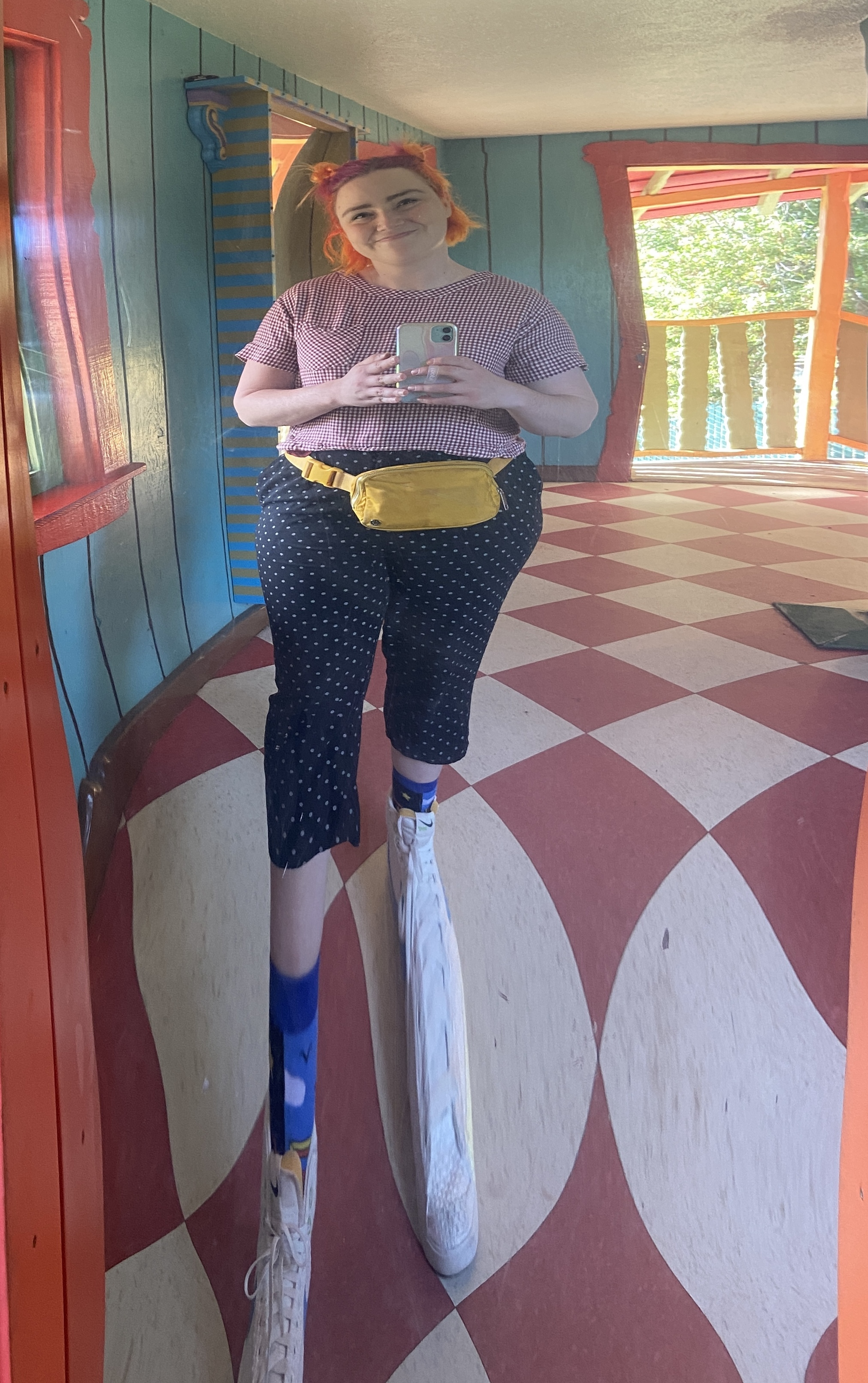
Image in a distorting mirror

A distorting mirror, funhouse mirror or carnival mirror is a popular attraction at carnivals and fairs. Instead of a normal plane mirror that reflects a perfect mirror image, distorting mirrors are curved mirrors, often using convex and concave sections to achieve the distorted effect. Because of their distorting properties, they are sometimes featured in fiction as a literary device, such as in Hans Christian Andersen's 1844 fairy tale The Snow Queen.

Distorted mirrors are used as a metaphor for describing Wikipedia, personalized medicine and social media which rather than reflecting society, tend to distort our perceptions of reality and social norms.
