= Radius of curvature (optics) =

Distance from the vertex of a lens or mirror to its center of curvature

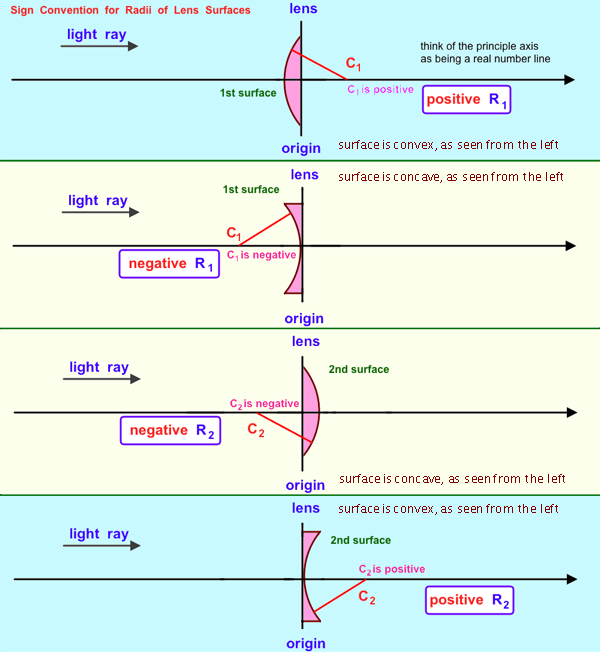
Radius of curvature sign convention for optical design

Radius of curvature (ROC) has specific meaning and sign convention in optical design. A spherical lens or mirror surface has a center of curvature located either along or decentered from the system local optical axis. The vertex of the lens surface is located on the local optical axis. The distance from the vertex to the center of curvature is the radius of curvature of the surface.

The sign convention for the optical radius of curvature is as follows:

- If the vertex lies to the left of the center of curvature, the radius of curvature is positive.
- If the vertex lies to the right of the center of curvature, the radius of curvature is negative.

Thus when viewing a biconvex lens from the side, the left surface radius of curvature is positive, and the right radius of curvature is negative.

Note however that in areas of optics other than design, other sign conventions are sometimes used. In particular, many undergraduate physics textbooks use the Gaussian sign convention in which convex surfaces of lenses are always positive. Care should be taken when using formulas taken from different sources.

== Aspheric surfaces ==
Optical surfaces with non-spherical profiles, such as the surfaces of aspheric lenses, also have a radius of curvature. These surfaces are typically designed such that their profile is described by the equation

$$z(r)=\frac{r^2}{R\left (1+\sqrt{1-(1+K)\frac{r^2}{R^2}}\right )}+\alpha_1 r^2+\alpha_2 r^4+\alpha_3 r^6+\cdots ,$$

where the optic axis is presumed to lie in the z direction, and $z(r)$ is the sag—the z-component of the displacement of the surface from the vertex, at distance $r$ from the axis. If $\alpha_1$ and $\alpha_2$ are zero, then $R$ is the radius of curvature and $K$ is the conic constant, as measured at the vertex (where $r=0$). The coefficients $\alpha_i$ describe the deviation of the surface from the axially symmetric quadric surface specified by $R$ and $K$.

== See also ==
- Radius of curvature (applications)
- Radius
- Base curve radius
- Cardinal point (optics)
- Vergence (optics)
