= Paraxial approximation =

Small angle approximation in geometric optics

The error associated with the paraxial approximation. In this plot the cosine is approximated by 1 - θ^{2}/2.

In geometric optics, the paraxial approximation is a small-angle approximation used in Gaussian optics and ray tracing of light through an optical system (such as a lens).

A paraxial ray is a ray that makes a small angle (θ) to the optical axis of the system, and lies close to the axis throughout the system. Generally, this allows three important approximations (for θ in radians) for calculation of the ray's path, namely:

$$\sin \theta \approx \theta,\quad
\tan \theta \approx \theta
\quad \text{and}\quad\cos \theta \approx 1.$$

The paraxial approximation is used in Gaussian optics and first-order ray tracing. Ray transfer matrix analysis is one method that uses the approximation.

In some cases, the second-order approximation is also called "paraxial". The approximations above for sine and tangent do not change for the "second-order" paraxial approximation (the second term in their Taylor series expansion is zero), while for cosine the second order approximation is

$$\cos \theta \approx 1 - { \theta^2 \over 2 } \ .$$

The second-order approximation is accurate within 0.5% for angles under about 10°, but its inaccuracy grows significantly for larger angles.

For larger angles it is often necessary to distinguish between meridional rays, which lie in a plane containing the optical axis, and sagittal rays, which do not.

Use of the small angle approximations replaces dimensionless trigonometric functions with angles in radians. In dimensional analysis on optics equations radians are dimensionless and therefore can be ignored.

A paraxial approximation is also commonly used in physical optics. It is used in the derivation of the paraxial wave equation from the homogeneous Maxwell's equations and, consequently, Gaussian beam optics.
