= Optical axis =

Line along which there is some degree of rotational symmetry in an optical system

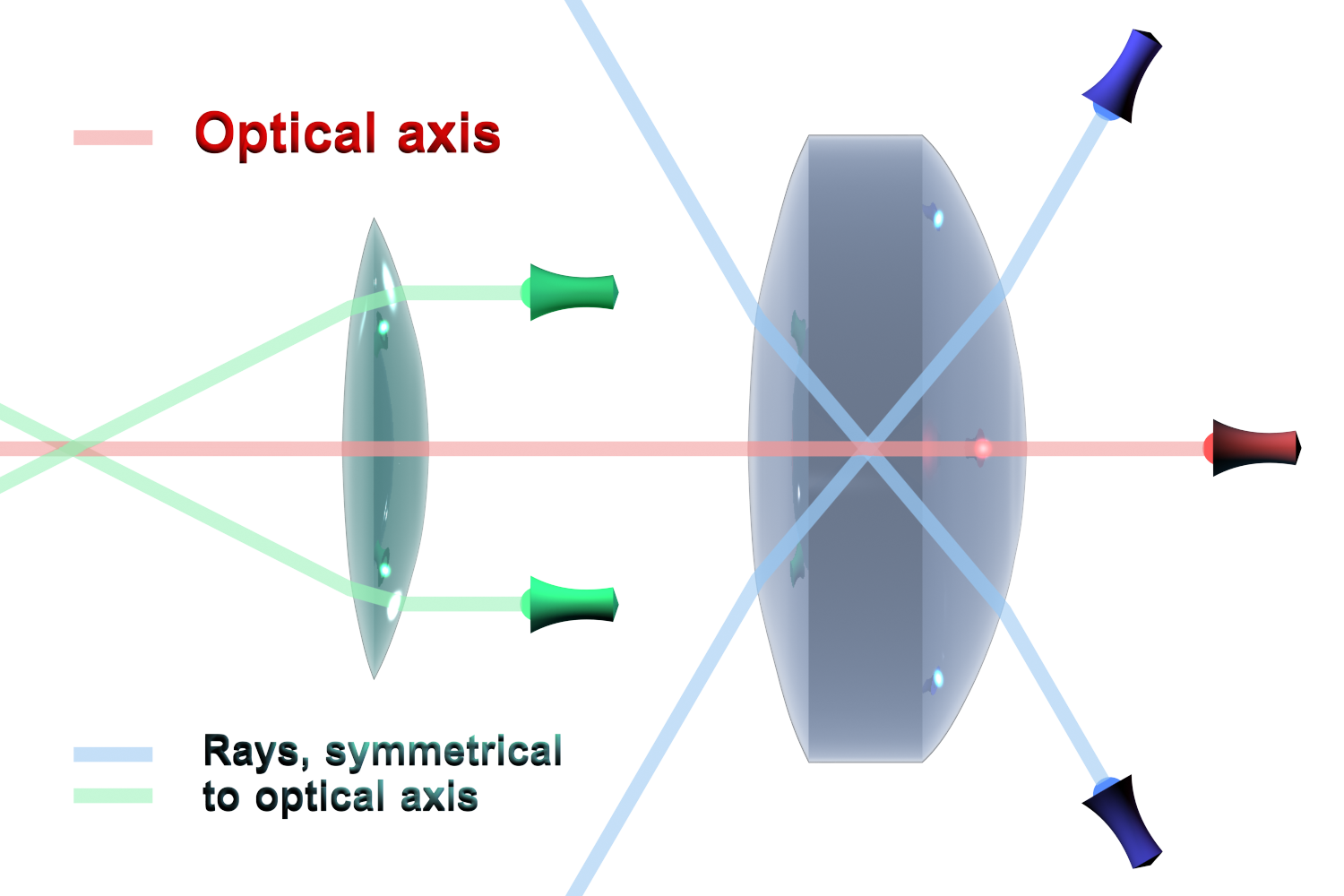
Optical axis (coincides with red ray) and rays symmetrical to optical axis (pair of blue and pair of green rays) propagating through different lenses.

An optical axis is an imaginary line that passes through the geometrical center of an optical system such as a camera lens, microscope or telescopic sight. Lens elements often have rotational symmetry about the axis.

The optical axis defines the path along which light propagates through the system, up to first approximation. For a system composed of simple lenses and mirrors, the axis passes through the center of curvature of each surface, and coincides with the axis of rotational symmetry. The optical axis is often coincident with the system's mechanical axis, but not always, as in the case of off-axis optical systems.

For an optical fiber, the optical axis is along the center of the fiber core, and is also known as the fiber axis.

== See also ==
- Ray (optics)
- Cardinal point (optics)
- Antenna boresight
