= Sparrow's resolution limit =

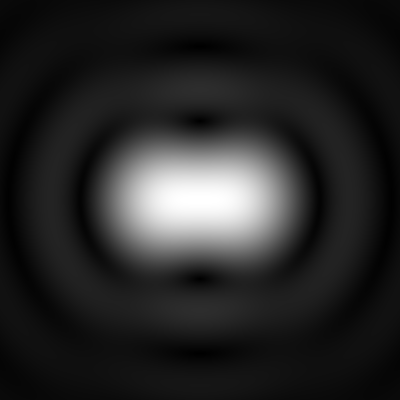
Diffraction pattern matching Sparrow's resolution limit

Sparrow's resolution limit is an estimate of the angular resolution limit of an optical instrument.

== Rayleigh criterion ==
When a star is observed with a telescope, the light is diffracted or spread apart into an Airy disk. The resolution limit is defined as the minimum angular separation between two stars that can still be perceived as separate by an observer. The angular diameter of the Airy disk is determined by the aperture of the instrument.

Rayleigh's resolution limit is reached when the two stars are separated by the theoretical radius of the first dark interval around the Airy disk, which is larger than the disk's apparent radius, so that a distinct dark gap appears between the two disks. Most astronomers say they can still distinguish the two stars when they are closer than Rayleigh's resolution limit. Sparrow's Resolution Limit is reached when the combined light from two overlapping and equally bright Airy disks is constant along a line between the central peak brightness of the two Airy disks. However, at the Sparrow resolution limit the two Airy disks will appear to be just touching at their edges, which according to Sparrow is due to a brightness contrast response of the eye. The same reasoning applies to the resolution of two wavelengths in a spectroscope, where lines of emission or absorption will have a diffraction induced width analogous to the diameter of an Airy disk.

Sparrow's resolution limit is nearly equivalent to the theoretical diffraction limit of resolution, the wavelength of light divided by the aperture diameter, and about 20% smaller than the Rayleigh limit. For example, in a 200 mm (eight-inch) telescope, Rayleigh's resolution limit is 0.69 arc seconds, Sparrow's resolution limit is 0.54 arc seconds.

== Dawes' limit ==
Sparrow's resolution limit was derived in 1916 from photographic experiments with simulated spectroscopic lines and is most commonly applied in spectroscopy, microscopy and photography. The Dawes resolution limit is more often used in visual double star astronomy.

== Sparrow criterion ==
The Sparrow criterion expresses the resolution limit in term of the joint intensity curve when observing two very closely separated wavelengths of equal intensity. They are considered resolved when the intensity at the midpoint between the peaks shows a minimum.
