= Optical unit =

Unit of measurement

Optical units are dimensionless units of length used in optical microscopy. They are used to express distances in terms of the numerical aperture of the system and the wavelength of the light used for observation. Using these units allows comparison of the properties of different microscopes. For example, the diameter of the first minimum of the Airy disk is always 7.6 optical units in the image plane of a diffraction limited microscope.

== Equations ==
There are two types of optical units. Radial optical units are measured in the image plane, and axial optical units are used to measure distances between the image plane and the observer.

The number of optical units $v$ in a given radial length $r$ is given by:

$v_\mathrm{radial} = \frac{2 \pi}{\lambda} \frac{n \sin \alpha}{M_\mathrm{tot}} r$

where:

- $\lambda$ is the wavelength
- $n \sin \alpha$ is the numerical aperture
- $M_\mathrm{tot}$ is the total magnification

Axial optical units are more complicated, as there is no simple definition of resolution in the axial direction. There are two forms of the optical unit for the axial direction.

For the case of a system with high numerical aperture, the axial optical units in a distance z are given by:

$u_z = \frac{2 \pi}{\lambda} \frac{ (n \sin \alpha)^2}{\eta} z$

where:

- $\eta$ is the index of refraction of the medium above the optical plane.

For systems with low numerical aperture, the axial optical unit is:

$u_z = \frac{8 \pi \eta}{\lambda} \sin^2(\frac{\alpha}{2}) z$
