= 4Pi STED microscopy =

The 4Pi-STED-microscope is the result of combining the two unrelated concepts of Stimulated emission depletion (STED) microscopy and 4Pi-microscopy. Here, a fluorescent sample is placed in the common focus of two opposing lenses, but excitation and detection are performed through a single lens (4Pi mode A). The green excitation pulse is immediately followed by a red STED-pulse, which enters the focal region through both lenses inducing stimulated emission of the excited fluorescent molecules to the ground state. To permit fluorescence emission from the center but suppress it from neighbouring regions it is useful to phase shift the STED beam to have a minimum at the center.
