= William Rutter Dawes =

British astronomer (1799–1868)

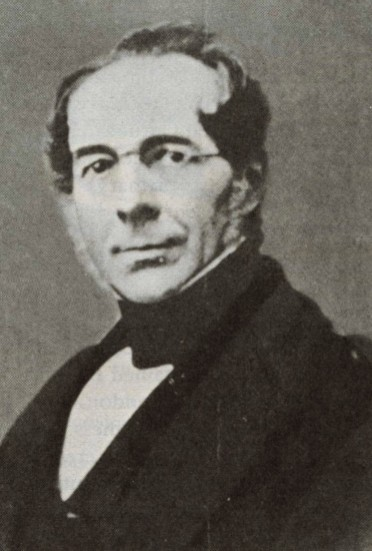
- A photograph, c. 1863
- Born: 19 March 1799; City of London, Great Britain
- Died: 15 February 1868 (aged 68)
- Citizenship: English
- Awards: Gold Medal of the Royal Astronomical Society (1855)
- Scientific career
- Fields: Astronomy

William Rutter Dawes (19 March 1799 – 15 February 1868) was an English astronomer.

== Biography ==
Dawes was born at Christ's Hospital then in the City of London (it moved to Horsham, West Sussex in 1902), the son of William Dawes, also an astronomer, and Judith Rutter. He qualified as a doctor in 1825. On 29 October 1828 he was ordained pastor at an Independent chapel in Burscough Street, Ormskirk, Lancashire, formerly part of a silk factory. A new chapel, in Chapel Street, was opened in 1834. Dawes resigned as pastor in December 1837 due to ill health. When, in 1843, the chapel got into financial difficulties due to the debt owing after its construction, Dawes came to their aid.

== Astronomy ==
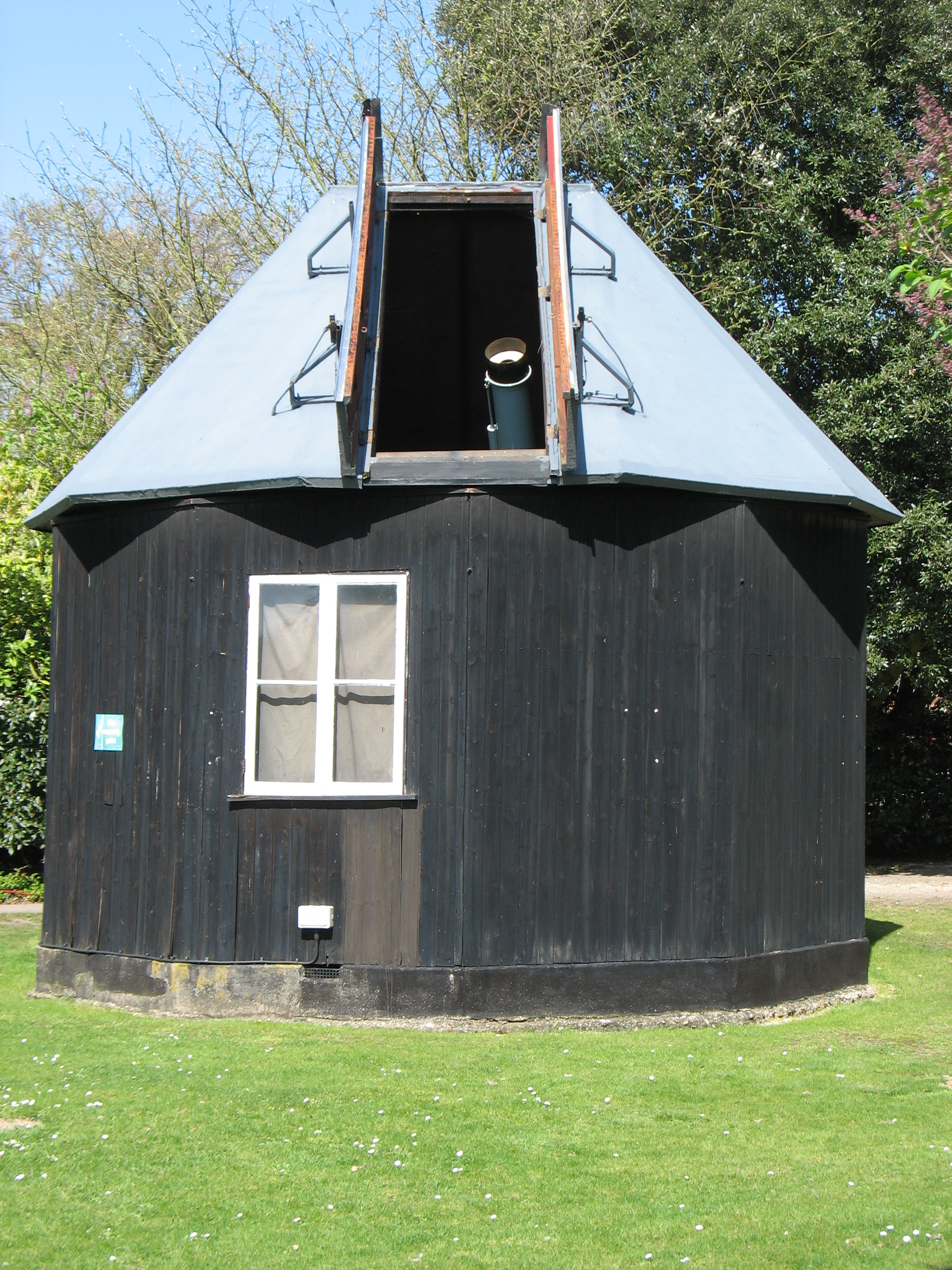
The Thorrowgood Telescope at Cambridge Observatory

Dawes made extensive measurements of double stars as well as observations of planets. He was a friend of William Lassell. He was nicknamed "eagle eyed". He set up his private observatory at his home, Hopefield House, built 1856-7 in Haddenham, Buckinghamshire. One of his telescopes, an eight-inch (200mm) aperture refractor by Cooke, survives at the Cambridge Observatory, now part of the Institute of Astronomy where it is known as the Thorrowgood Telescope.

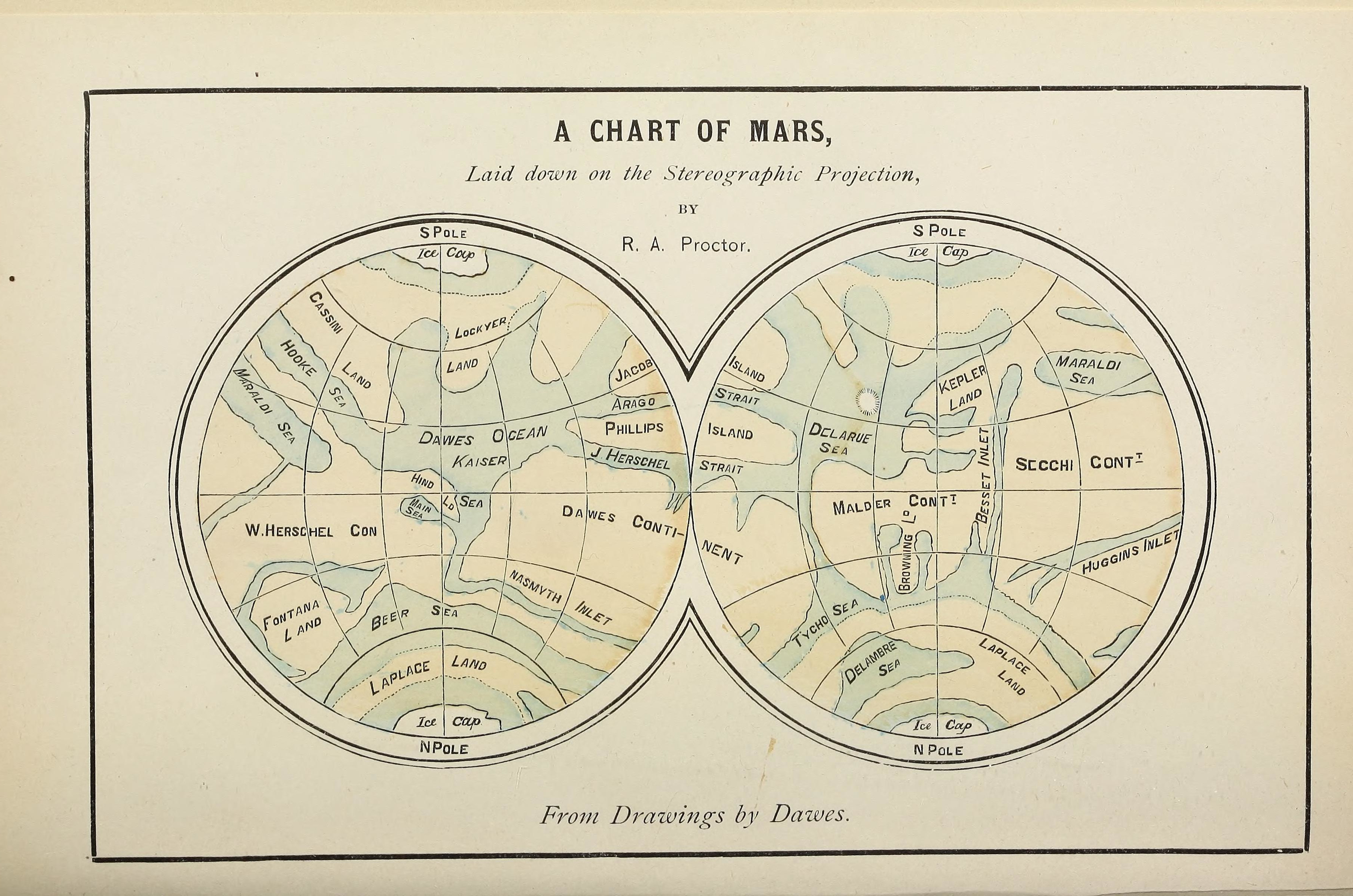
A Chart of Mars Laid down on the Stereographic Projection by R A Proctor. From: Other Worlds Than Ours, 1896.

He made extensive drawings of Mars during its 1864 opposition. In 1867, Richard Anthony Proctor made a map of Mars based on these drawings. Proctor named two features after Dawes.

He was elected a Fellow of the Royal Astronomical Society in 1830 and a Fellow of the Royal Society in 1865, for his astronomical work. Proposers for his Royal Society Fellowship included G B Airy and J F W Herschel.

== Awards ==
He won the Gold Medal of the Royal Astronomical Society in 1855.

== Legacy ==
Dawes craters on the Moon and Dawes crater on Mars are named after him, as is a gap within Saturn's C Ring, formerly labelled 1.495 R_{S}.

An optical phenomenon, the Dawes limit, is named after him.

== Family ==
Dawes married twice. His first wife was Mary Scott née Egerton (1764–1840). They married on 13 January 1824 at Haddenham, Buckinghamshire. She was the widow of his tutor, Thomas Scott. On 28 July 1842 Dawes married Ann Welsby née Coupland (1805–1860). She was the widow of Ormskirk solicitor John Welsby (1800–1839) whom she had married on 16 January 1824.

William Rutter Dawes'S grave, St Mary's Church, Haddenham, Buckinghamshire.
REV DR WILLIAM RUTTER DAWES FRAS FRS

BORN 19 MAR 1799 DIED 15 FEB 1868
ASTRONOMER
HE MARRIED TWO WIDOWS MRS THOMAS SCOTT AND MRS JOHN WELSBY AND SURVIVED THEM BOTH

HE BUILT HOPEFIELD IN 1857 AND LIVED THERE UNTIL HIS DEATH

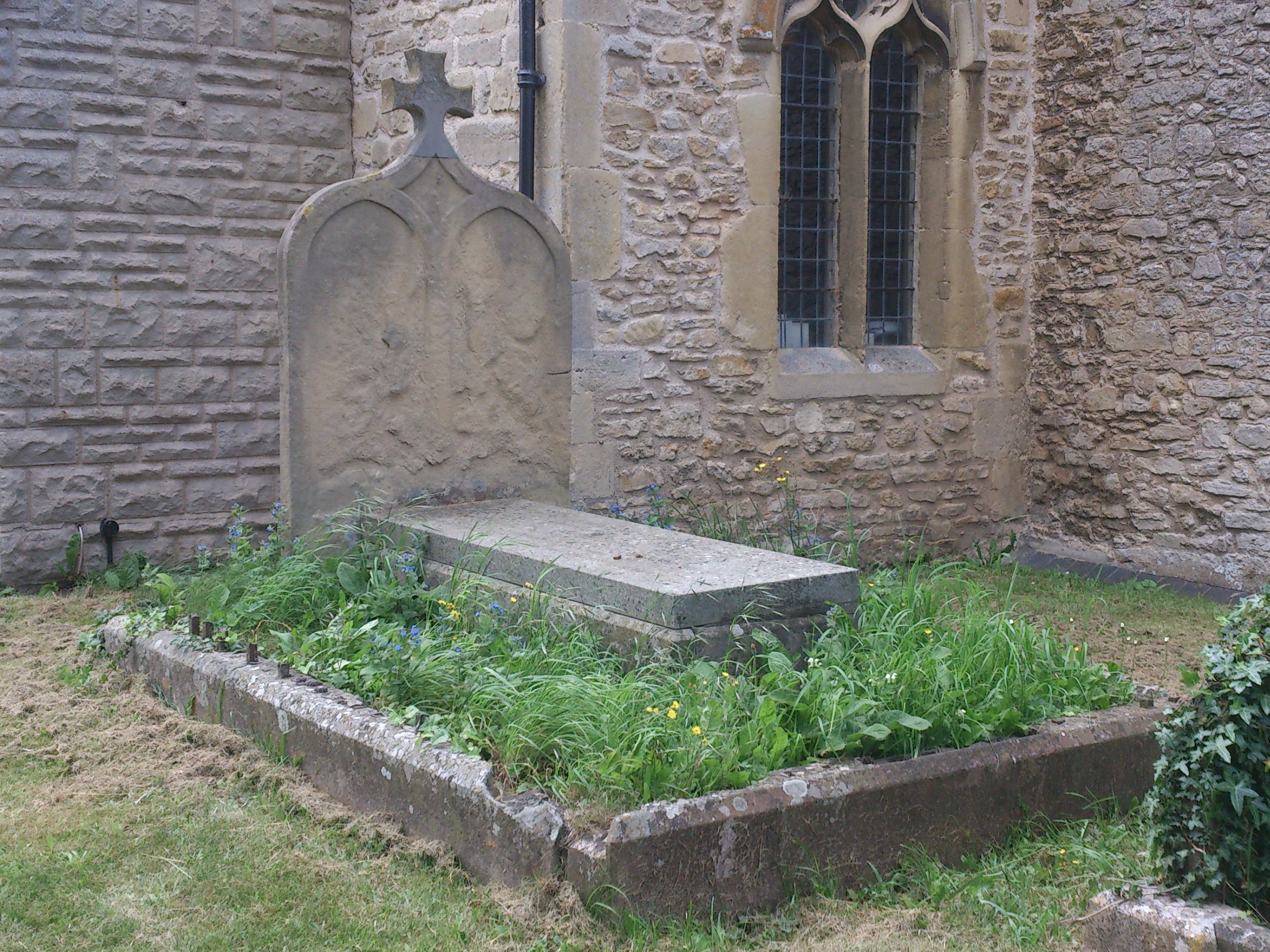

== Selected writings ==
- Dawes, William Rutter (1849). The Stars in Six Maps, on the Gnomonic Projection. C. Knight. Bibcode:1849ssmg.book.....D.
