= Dawes' limit =

Formula for maximum resolving power of microscope

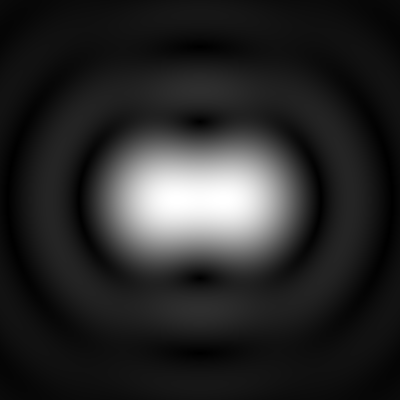
diffraction pattern matching Dawes' limit

Dawes' limit is a formula to express the maximum resolving power of a microscope or telescope. It is so named after its discoverer, William Rutter Dawes, although it is also credited to Lord Rayleigh.

The formula takes different forms depending on the units.

R = 4.56/D	D in inches, R in arcseconds
R = 116/D	D in millimeters, R in arcseconds
where	D is the diameter of the main lens (aperture)
	R is the resolving power of the instrument

This formula agrees with the usual $R = 1.22 \lambda/D$ at a wavelength of about 460nm, somewhat bluer than the peak sensitivity of rod cells at c. 498nm.

== See also ==
- Rayleigh criterion
