= Telescopic sight =

Optical sighting device for firearms

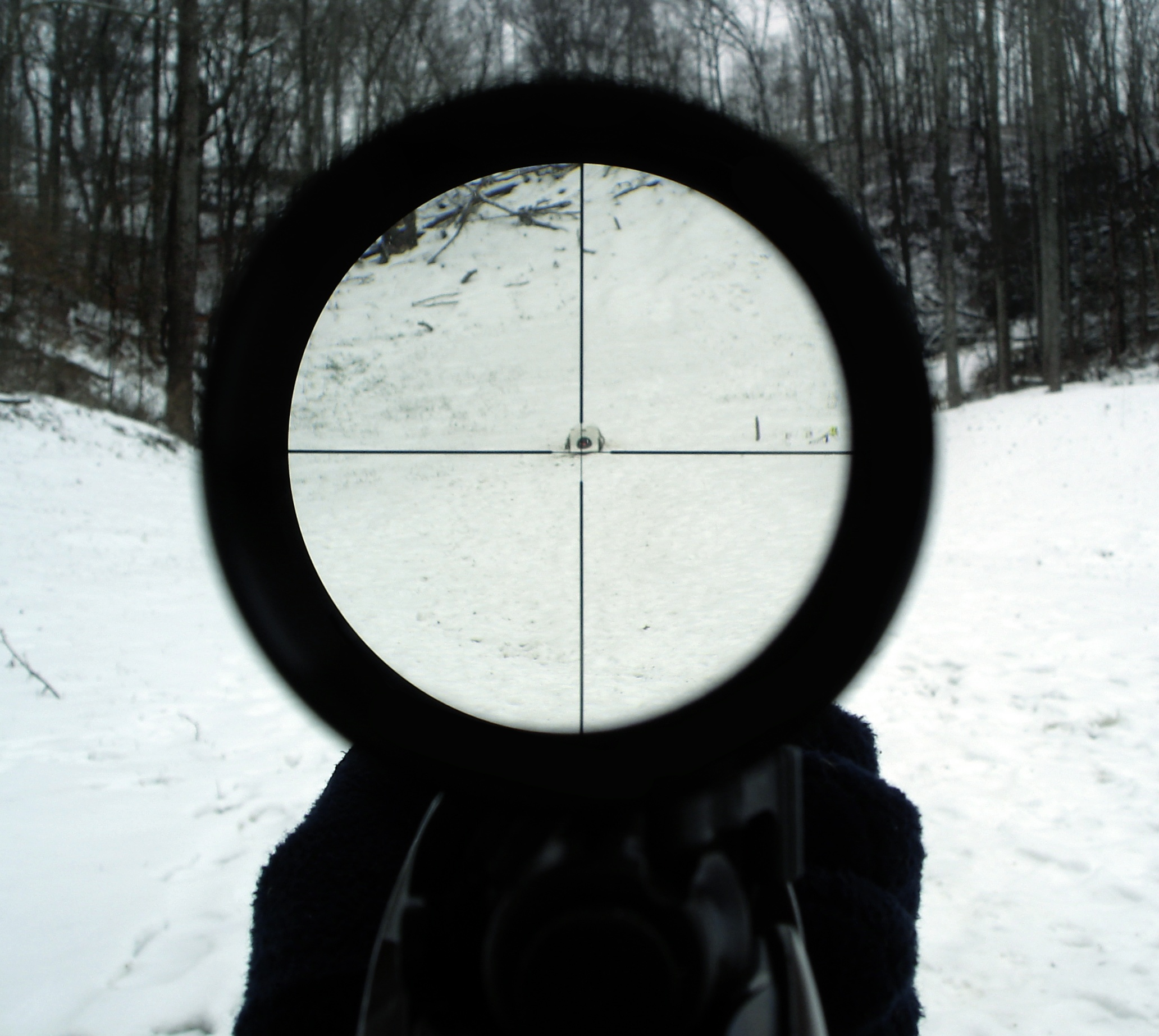
View through a 4× telescopic sight

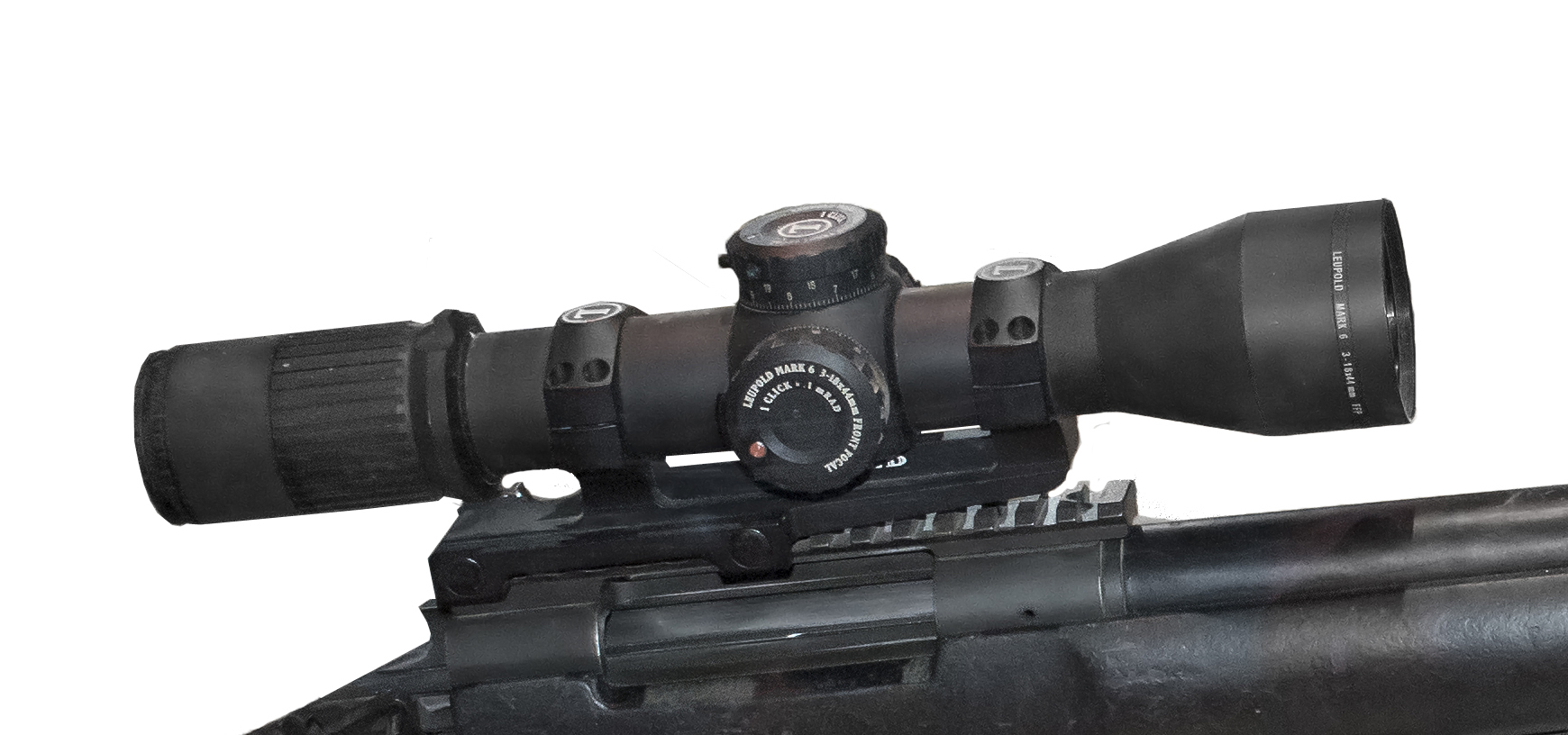
Leupold and Stevens Mark 6 scope with variable magnification X3-X18, mounted on an M24 SWS

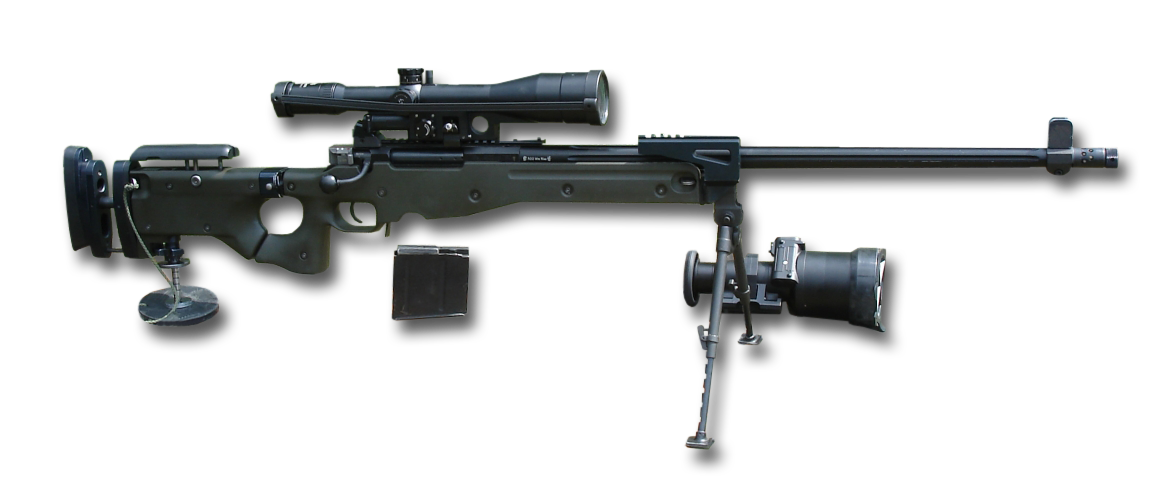
German military sniper rifle with a mounted telescopic sight and dismounted NSV80 clip on optoelectronic image intensifier

A telescopic sight, commonly called a scope informally, is an optical sighting device based on a refracting telescope. Sights are equipped with a referencing pattern (reticle) mounted in a focally appropriate position in its optical system to provide an accurate point of aim. Telescopic sights are classified in terms of the optical magnification (power) and the objective lens diameter.

The first experiments directed to give shooters optical aiming aids go back to the early 17th century. For centuries, different optical aiming aids and primitive predecessors of telescopic sights were created that had practical or performance limitations. Most early telescopic sights were fixed-power and were in essence specially designed viewing telescopes. Telescopic sights with variable magnifications appeared later, and were varied by manually adjusting a zoom mechanism behind the erector lenses. Other types of scopes include prism sights and low-power variable optics.

Telescopic sights have both advantages and disadvantages relative to iron sights. They are built to various specifications and use a variety of adjustment controls, reticles, features, technologies, and mounting systems. These specifications are often selected based on the intended use of the sight.

== Description ==
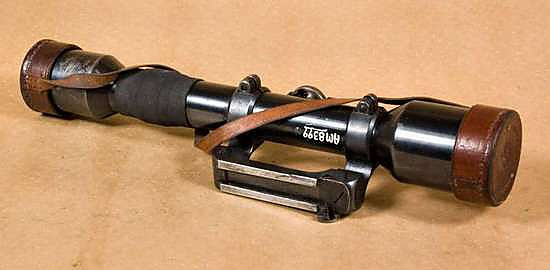
German-made ZF Ajack 4×90 (4×38 in modern terminology) for the World War II-pattern Swedish Mauser m/1941 sniper rifle.

A telescopic sight is an optical sighting device based on a refracting telescope. It is equipped with some form of a referencing pattern – known as a reticle – mounted in a focally appropriate position in its optical system to provide an accurate point of aim. Telescopic sights are used with all types of systems that require magnification in addition to reliable visual aiming, as opposed to non-magnifying iron sights, reflector (reflex) sights, holographic sights or laser sights, and are most commonly found on long-barrel firearms, particularly rifles, usually via a scope mount. Similar devices are also found on other platforms such as artillery, tanks and even aircraft. The optical components may be combined with optoelectronics to add night vision or smart device features.

Telescopic sights are classified in terms of the optical magnification (i.e., power) and the objective lens diameter. For example, "10×50" would denote a fixed magnification factor of 10×, with a 50 mm objective lens. In general terms, larger objective lens diameters, due to their ability to gather a higher luminous flux, provide a larger exit pupil and hence provide a brighter image at the eyepiece.

== History ==
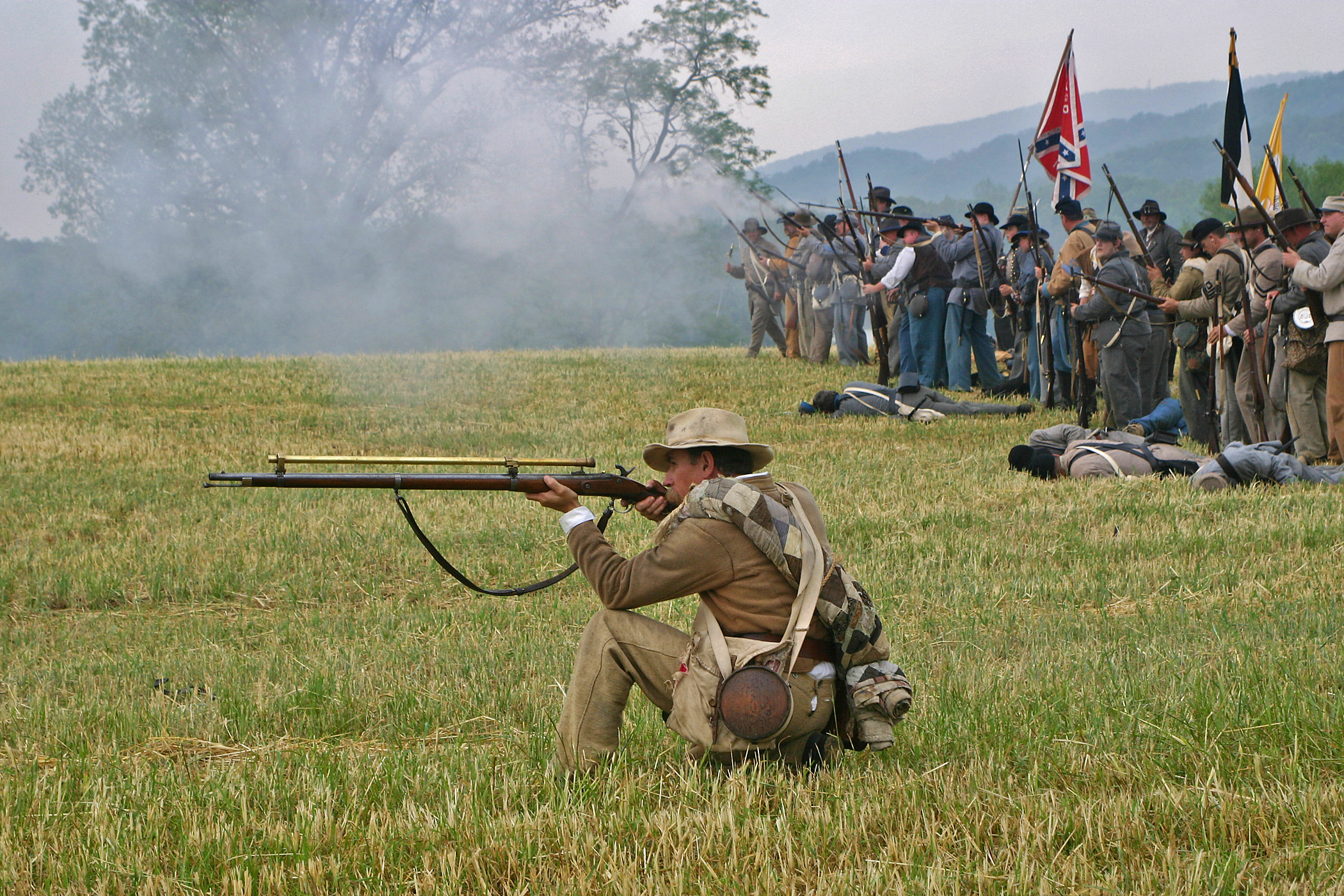
A Civil War reenactment of the Battle of Bean Station with a Confederate sharpshooter shooting a Whitworth rifle equipped with a Wm. Malcolm long-tube scope.

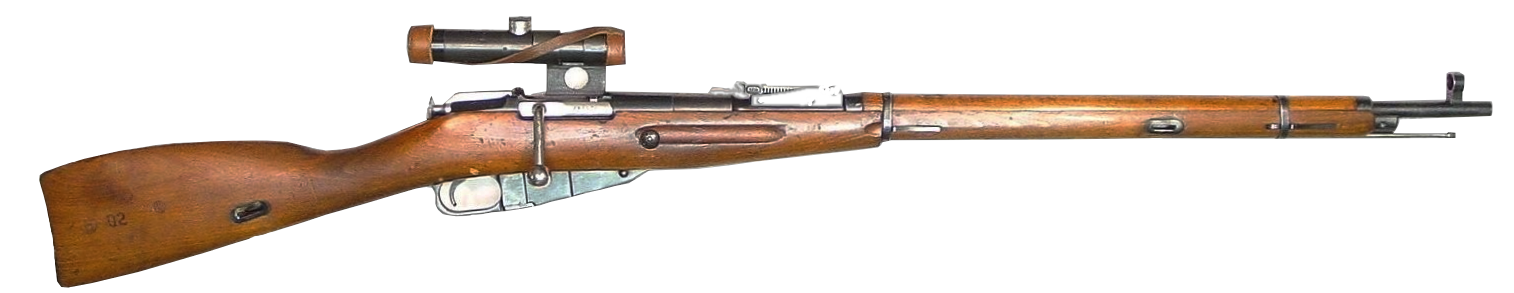
Russian Model 1891/30 sniper rifle with PU 3.5×21 scope

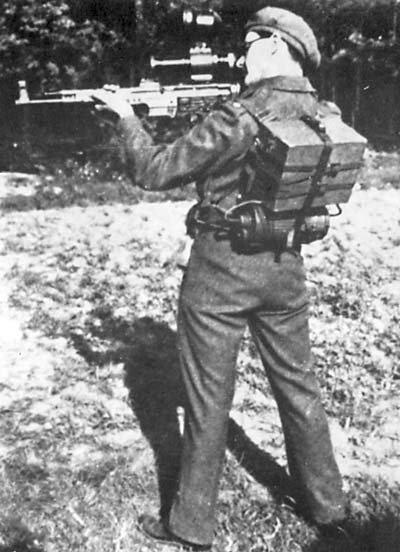
A British soldier testing a ZG 1229 Vampir night scope (circa 1945)

The first experiments directed to give shooters optical aiming aids go back to the early 17th century. For centuries, different optical aiming aids and primitive predecessors of telescopic sights were created that had practical or performance limitations.

In the late 1630s, English amateur astronomer William Gascoigne was experimenting with a Keplerian telescope and left it with the case open. Later he found that a spider had spun its web inside the case, and when he looked through the telescope he found that the web was in focus with distant objects. Gascoigne realised that he could use this principle to make a telescopic sight for use in his astronomical observations.

"This is that admirable secret, which, as all other things, appeared when it pleased the All Disposer, at whose direction a spider's line drawn in an opened case could first give me by its perfect apparition, when I was with two convexes trying experiments about the sun, the unexpected knowledge...if I .... placed a thread where that glass [the eyepiece] would best discern it, and then joining both glasses, and fitting their distance for any object, I should see this at any part that I did direct it to ..."

— William Gascoigne

In 1776, Charles Willson Peale collaborated with David Rittenhouse to mount a telescope to a rifle as a sighting aid, but was unable to mount it sufficiently far forward to prevent the eyepiece impacting with the operator's eye during recoil. In the same year, James Lind and Captain Alexander Blair described a gun which included a telescopic sight.

The first rifle sight was created in 1835–1840. In the book The Improved American Rifle, written in 1844, British-American civil engineer John R. Chapman described a sight made by gunsmith Morgan James of Utica, New York. Chapman worked with James on the concepts and design of the Chapman-James sight. In 1855, optician William Malcolm of Syracuse, New York began producing his own telescopic sight, used an original design incorporating achromatic lenses such as those used in telescopes, and improved the windage and elevation adjustments. These Malcolm sights were between 3× and 20× magnification (possibly more). Malcolm's sights and those made by Vermont jeweler L. M. Amidon were the standard sharpshooter equipment during the American Civil War. Other telescopic sights of the same period were the Davidson and the Parker Hale.

An early practical refracting telescope based telescopic sight was built in 1880 by August Fiedler (of Stronsdorf, Austria), forestry commissioner of German Prince Reuss. Later telescopic sights with extra long eye relief became available for use on handguns and scout rifles. A historical example of a long-eye relief (LER) telescopic sight is the German ZF41 which was used during World War II on Karabiner 98k rifles.

An early example of a man-portable sight for low visibility/night use is the Zielgerät (aiming device) 1229 (ZG 1229), also known by its code name Vampir ("vampire"). The ZG 1229 Vampir was a Generation 0 active infrared night vision device developed for the Wehrmacht for the StG 44 assault rifle, intended primarily for night use. The issuing of the ZG 1229 Vampir system to the military started in 1944 and it was used on a small scale in combat from February 1945 until the final stages of World War II.

== Types ==
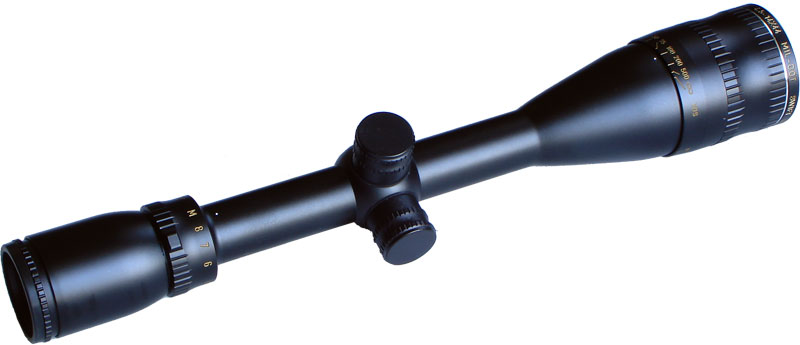
A Swift model 687M variable power rifle telescopic sight with parallax compensation (the ring around the objective lens is used for making parallax adjustments).

Most early telescopic sights were fixed-power and were in essence specially designed viewing telescopes. Telescopic sights with variable magnifications appeared later, and were varied by manually adjusting a zoom mechanism behind the erector lenses. Variable-power sights offer more flexibility when shooting at varying distances, target sizes and light conditions, and offer a relatively wide field of view at lower magnification settings.

The syntax for variable sights is the following: minimal magnification – maximum magnification × objective lens, for example "3-9×40" means a telescopic sight with variable magnification between 3× and 9×, and a 40 mm objective lens. The ratio between the maximum and minimum magnifications of a variable-power sight is known as its zoom ratio.

Confusingly, some older telescopic sights (mainly of German or other European manufacturers), have a different classification where the second part of the designation refers to light-gathering power. In these cases, a 4×81 (4× magnification) sight would be presumed to have a brighter sight picture than a 2.5×70 (2.5× magnification), but the objective lens diameter would not bear any direct relation to picture brightness, as brightness is affected also by the magnification factor. Typically, objective lenses on early sights are smaller than modern sights. In these examples, the 4×81 would have an objective 36 mm diameter and the 2.5×70 should be approximately 21 mm. (Note: Relative luminosity is the square of the exit pupil as measured in mm; a 36 mm objective lens diameter divided by the 4× magnification gives an exit pupil of 9 mm; 9×9=81)

=== Prismatic telescopic sight ===
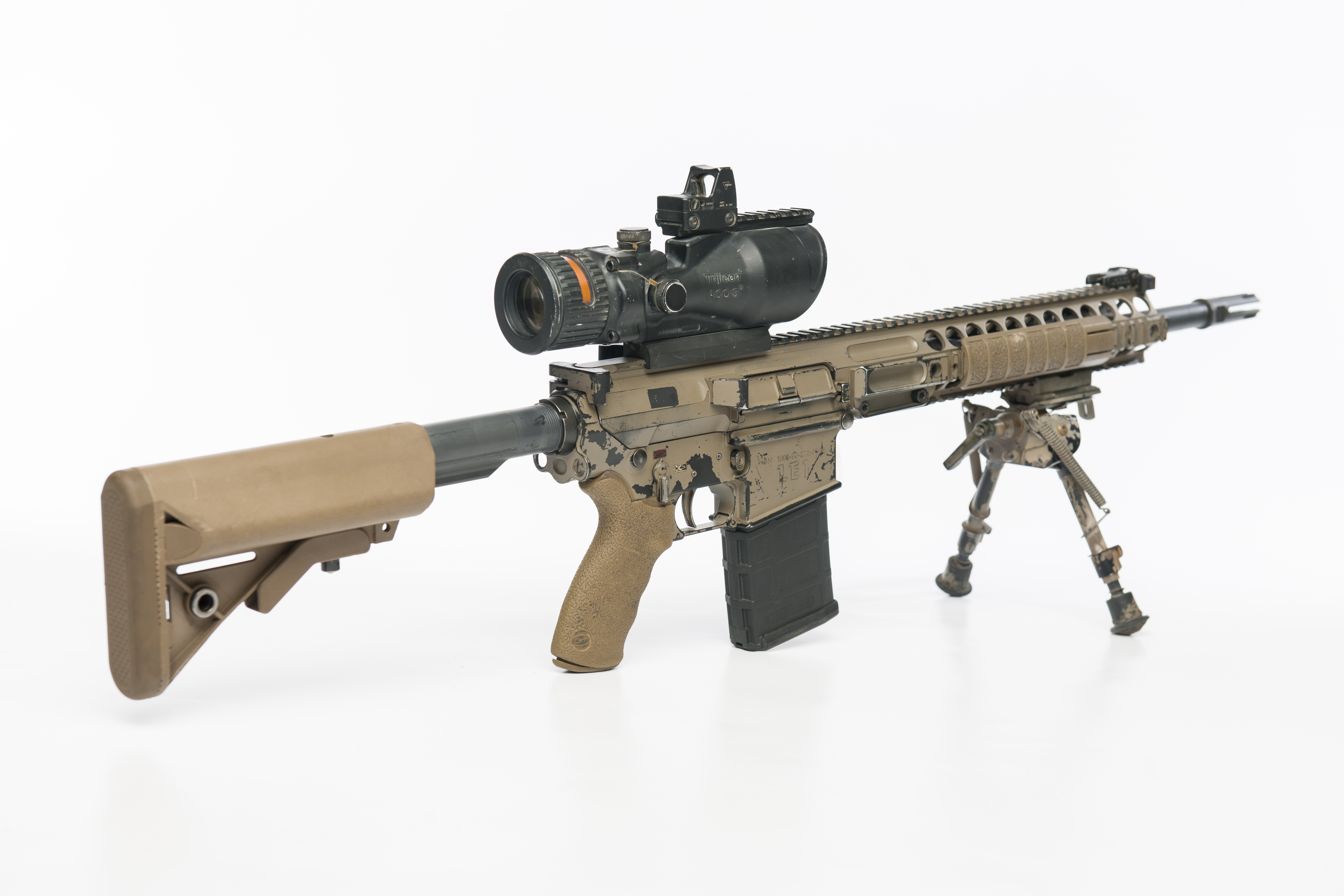
A British L129A1 sharpshooter rifle with a TA648-308 6×48 ACOG fitted

A relatively new type of telescopic sight, called prismatic telescopic sight, prismatic sight or prism scope, replaces the image-erecting relay lenses of a traditional telescope with a roof prism design commonly found in compact binoculars, monoculars and spotting scopes. The reticle is etched onto one of the prism's internal reflection surfaces, which allows an easy way to illuminate the reticle (from the back side of the prism) even when active illumination is turned off. Being optical telescopes, prism sights can focally compensate for a user's astigmatism.

Prismatic sights are lighter and more compact than conventional telescopic sights, but are mostly fixed-powered in the low magnification ranges (usually 2×, 2.5×, 3× or more commonly 4×, occasionally 1× or 5× or more), suitable for shooting at short/medium distances. One of the best known examples is the battle-proven Trijicon ACOG used by the USMC, US Army, and USSOCOM, although variable-magnification prism sights do also exist, such as the ELCAN Specter DR/TR series used by the Canadian Army.

=== Low-power variable optic ===
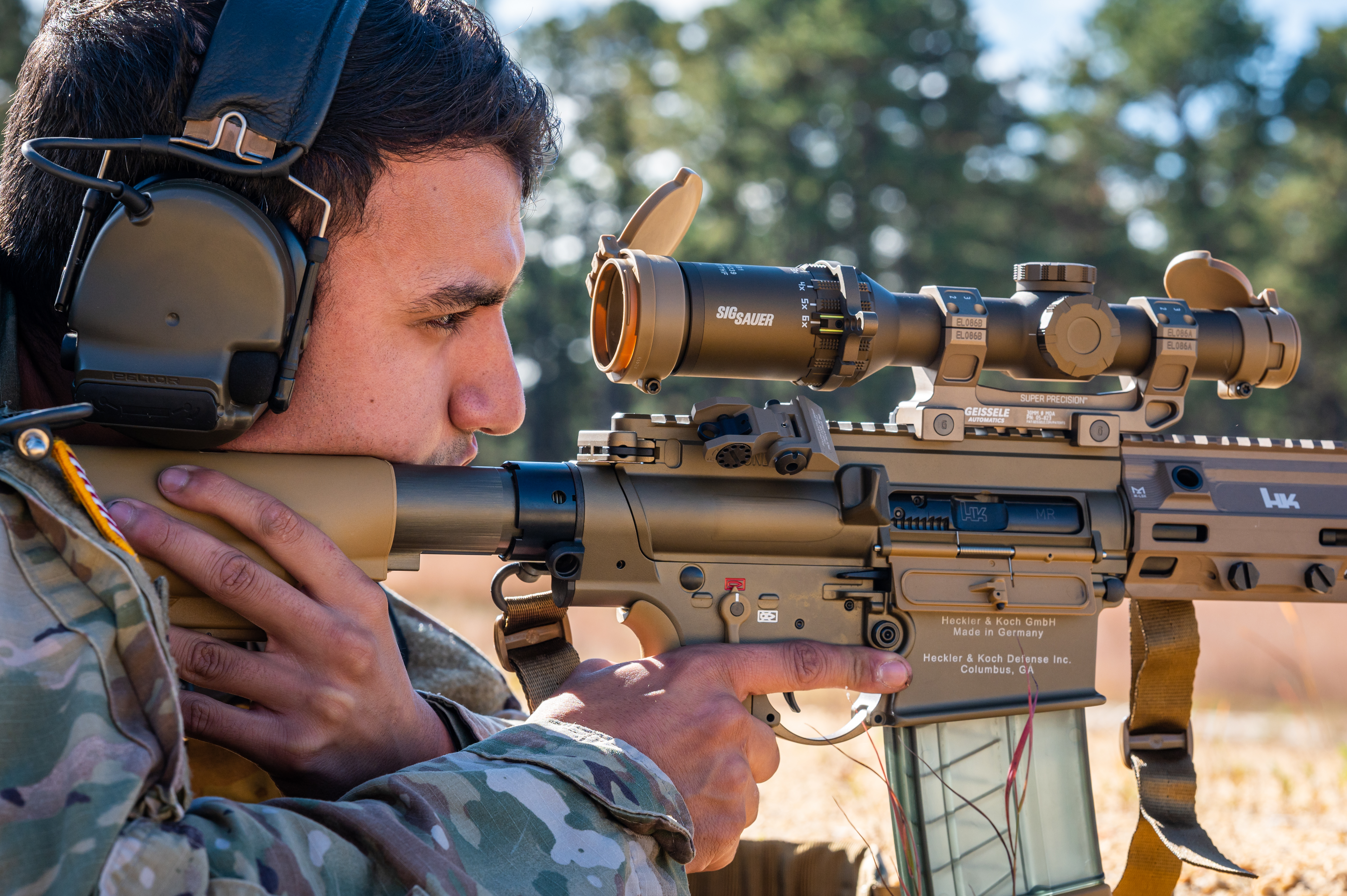
A SIG Sauer TANGO6T 1‑6×24mm LVPO on a M110A1 SDMR

Variable-zoom telescopic sights in the low magnification range (1–4×, 1–6×, 1–8×, or even 1–10×) are known as low-power variable optics or LPVOs. These telescopic sights are often equipped with built-in reticle illumination and can be dialed down to 1× magnification. As low magnifications are mostly used in close- and medium ranges, LPVOs typically have no parallax compensation (though a few rare models do) and have a completely cylindrical shape ahead of the eyepiece, since the image illuminance is often sufficient without needing an enlarged objective bell to enhance light-gathering. Most LPVOs have reticles mounted at the second focal plane, but recently first-focal plane LPVOs have become popular, especially those with high zoom ratios above 6×.

LPVOs are also informally referred to as "AR scopes" or "carbine scopes", due to the recently increasing popularity of modern sporting rifles and compact "tactical"-style semi-automatic rifles used among the law enforcement, home defense and practical shooting enthusiasts crowd.

== Specifications ==
=== Optical parameters ===
Telescopic sights are usually designed for the specific application for which they are intended. Those different designs create certain optical parameters. Those parameters are:

- Magnification – The ratio of the focal length of the objective divided by the focal length of the eyepiece gives the linear magnifying power of telescopes. A magnification factor of 10, for example, produces an image as if one were 10 times closer to the object. The amount of magnification depends upon the application the telescopic sight is designed for. Lower magnifications lead to less susceptibility to shaking. A larger magnification leads to a smaller field of view.
- Objective lens diameter – The diameter of the objective lens determines how much light can be gathered to form an image. It is usually expressed in millimeters.
- Field of view – The field of view of a telescopic sight is determined by its optical design. It is usually notated in a linear value, such as how many meters (feet) in width will be seen at 100 m (110 yd), or in an angular value of how many degrees can be viewed.
- Exit pupil – Telescopic sights concentrate the light gathered by the objective into a beam, the exit pupil, whose diameter is the objective diameter divided by the magnifying power. For maximum effective light-gathering and brightest image, the exit pupil should equal the diameter of the fully dilated iris – for a youthful dark-adapted human eye about 7 mm, reducing with age. If the cone of light streaming out of the eyepiece is larger than the pupil it is going into, any light shining outside the pupil is considered "wasted" in terms of providing visual information.

However, a larger exit pupil makes it easier to put the eye where it can receive the light: anywhere in the large exit pupil cone of light will do. This ease of placement helps avoid vignetting, which is a darkened or obscured view that occurs when the light path is partially blocked. And, it means that the image can be quickly found which is important when aiming at game animals that move rapidly. A narrow exit pupil telescopic sight may also be fatiguing because the instrument must be held exactly in place in front of the eyes to provide a useful image. Finally, many people in Europe use their telescopic sights at dusk, dawn and at night, when their pupils are larger. Thus the daytime exit pupil of about 3 to 4 mm is not a universally desirable standard. For comfort, ease of use, and flexibility in applications, larger telescopic sights with larger exit pupils are satisfying choices even if their capability is not fully used by day.

- Eye relief – Eye relief is the distance from the rear eyepiece lens to the exit pupil or eye point. It is the optimal distance the observer must position their eye behind the eyepiece to see a non-vignetted image. The longer the focal length of the eyepiece, the greater the eye relief. Typical telescopic sights may have eye relief ranging from 25 mm (0.98 in) to over 100 mm (3.9 in), but telescopic sights intended for scout rifles or handguns need much longer eye relief to present a non-vignetted image. Telescopic sights with relatively long eye relief are favorable to avoid periorbital lacerations and eye injuries caused by recoil-induced collision with the metal eyepiece (colloquially known as a "scope bite"), especially in instances where it is difficult to keep the stock steady. Eye relief is important for eyeglasses wearers, as the presence of an eyeglass in front of the eye shortens the available physical space before colliding with the eyepiece, so a longer eye relief is necessitated.

==== Optical coatings ====
Because a typical telescopic sight has several optical elements with special characteristics and several air-to-glass surfaces, telescopic sight manufacturers use different types of optical coatings for technical reasons and to improve the image they produce. Lens coatings can increase light transmission, minimize reflections, repel water and grease and even protect the lens from scratches. Manufacturers often have their own designations for their lens coatings.

===== Anti-reflective =====
Anti-reflective coatings reduce light lost at every optical surface through reflection at each surface. Reducing reflection via anti-reflective coatings also reduces the amount of "lost" light present inside the telescopic sight which would otherwise make the image appear hazy (low contrast). A telescopic sight with good optical coatings may yield a brighter image than uncoated telescopic sights with a larger objective lens, on account of superior light transmission through the assembly. The first transparent interference-based coating Transparentbelag (T) used by Zeiss was invented in 1935 by Olexander Smakula.

A classic lens-coating material is magnesium fluoride, which reduces reflected light from 5% to 1%. Modern lens coatings consist of complex multi-layers and reflect only 0.25% or less to yield an image with maximum brightness and natural colors. Determined by the optical properties of the lenses used and intended primary use of the telescopic sight, different coatings are preferred, to optimize light transmission dictated by the human eye luminous efficiency function variance.

Maximal light transmission around wavelengths of 555 nm (green) is important for obtaining optimal photopic vision using the eye cone cells for observation in well-lit conditions. Maximal light transmission around wavelengths of 498 nm (cyan) is important for obtaining optimal scotopic vision using the eye rod cells for observation in low light conditions. These allow high-quality 21st century telescopic sights to practically achieve measured over 90% light transmission values in low light conditions.

Depending on the coating, the character of the image seen in the telescopic sight under normal daylight can either "warmer" or "colder" and appear either with higher or lower contrast. Subject to the application, the coating is also optimized for maximum color fidelity through the visible spectrum. A common application technique is physical vapor deposition of one or more superimposed very thin anti-reflective coating layer(s) which includes evaporative deposition, making it a complex production process.

=== Tube size ===
The main tube of telescopic sights varies in size, material, the applied production process and surface finish. The typical outside diameters vary between 19.05 mm (0.75 in) and 40 mm (1.57 in), although 25.4 mm (1 in), 30 mm and recently 34 mm are by far the most common sizes. The internal diameter of the main tube influences the amount of space within which the relay lens group and other optical elements can be mounted, the maximum size of the erector tube, and the maximum angular ranges for elevation and windage adjustments.

Telescopic sights intended for long-range and/or low-light usage generally feature larger main tube diameters. Besides optical, spatial and attainable range of elevation and windage adjustments considerations, larger diameter main tubes offer the possibility to increase the tube walls thickness (hence a more robust sight) without sacrificing a lot of internal diameter.

== Adjustment controls ==
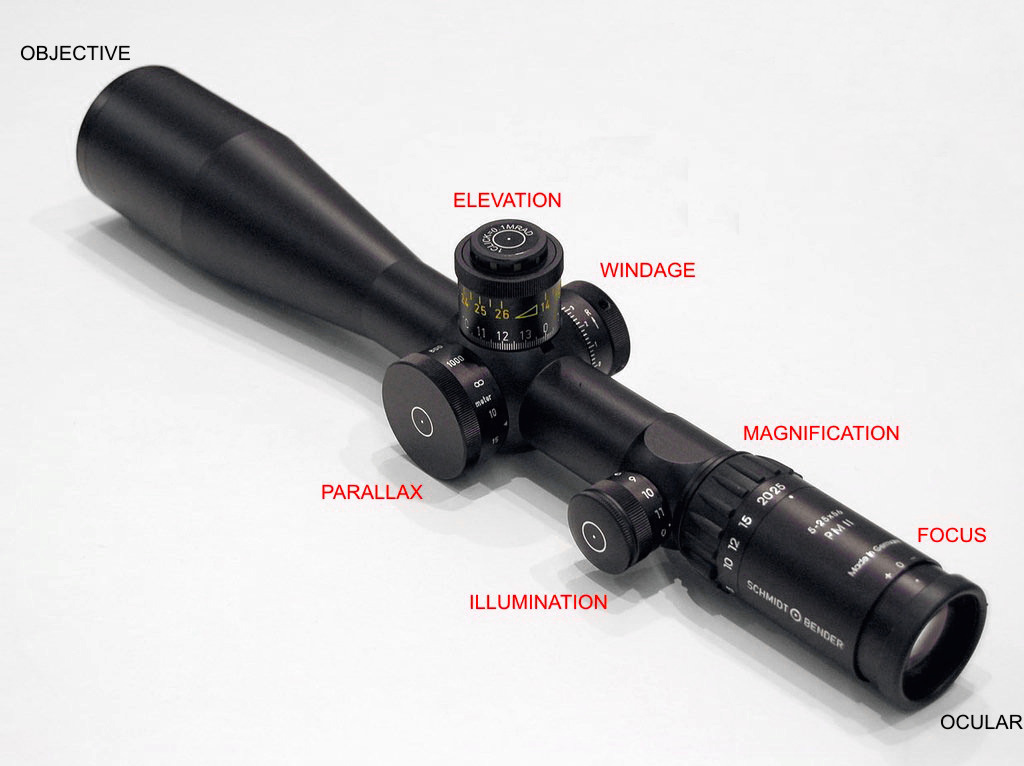
The adjustment controls of a telescopic sight with an elevation adjustment knob featuring a zero-stop and second revolution indicator.

A telescopic sight can have several manual adjustment controls in the form of control knobs or coaxial rings.

- Diopter adjustment (also called the ocular focus) on the eyepiece — meant to obtain a sharp picture of the target object and reticle.
- Elevation control – meant to adjust (or "track") the vertical deviation of the optical axis. Elevation tracking to intentionally compensate for bullet drop at various ranges will only function as intended if the telescopic sight is mounted without cant.
  - "Zero-stop" features prevent inadvertently dialing the adjustment knob "below" the primary zero (usually 100 meters/yards for long-range sights), or at least prevent dialing more than a couple adjustment clicks below zero. This feature is also useful on long-range sights because it allows the shooter to physically verify the elevation knob is dialed all the way down, avoiding confusion regarding the elevation status on two- or multi-revolution elevation knobs.
- Windage control – meant to adjust (or "track") the horizontal deviation of the optical axis.
- Magnification control – meant to change the magnification factor by turning a coaxial wheel that is generally marked with corresponding magnification numbers.
- Reticle illumination control – meant to regulate the brightness level of assisted illumination on the reticle.
- Parallax compensation control – mean to neutralize the focal difference between the target image and the reticle.

All telescopic sights have the first three (diopter, elevation, windage) adjustment controls, and the fourth (magnification) control is offered on variable-power sights. The remaining two adjustments are optional and typically only found on higher-end models with additional features.

The windage and elevation adjustment knobs (colloquially called "tracking turrets") often have internal ball detents to help accurately index their rotation, which provide a crisp tactile feedback corresponding to each graduation of turn, often accompanied by a soft but audible clicking sound. Each indexing increment is thus colloquially called a "click", and the corresponding angular adjustment of the optical axis is known as the click value. The most commonly seen click values are 1/4 MOA (often expressed in approximations as "1/4 inch at 100 yards") and 0.1 mil (often expressed as "10 mm at 100 meters"), although other click values such as 1/2 MOA, 1/3 MOA or 1/8 MOA and other mil increments are also present on the commercial and military and law enforcement sights.

Older telescopic sights often did not offer internal windage and/or elevation adjustments in the telescopic sight. In case the telescopic sight lacked internal adjustment mechanisms adjustable mounts are used (on the scope rings or the mounting rail itself) for sighting-in.

== Reticles ==
Various reticles.

Rangefinder reticle.

Telescopic sights come with a variety of different reticles, ranging from the simple crosshairs to complex reticles designed to allow the shooter to range a target, to compensate for the bullet drop, and to adjust windage required due to crosswinds. A user can estimate the range to objects of known size, the size of objects at known distances, and even roughly compensate for both bullet drop and wind drifts at known ranges with a reticle-equipped sight.

For example, with a typical Leupold brand 16 minute of angle (MOA) duplex reticle (similar to image B) on a fixed-power telescopic sight, the distance from post to post, between the heavier lines of the reticle spanning the center of the sight picture, is approximately 32 inches (810 millimeters) at 200 yards (180 m), or, equivalently, approximately 16 inches (410 millimeters) from the center to any post at 200 yards.

If a target of a known diameter of 16 inches fills just half of the total post-to-post distance (i.e. filling from sight center to post), then the distance to target is approximately 200 yards (180 m). With a target of a diameter of 16 inches that fills the entire sight picture from post to post, the range is approximately 100 yards. Other ranges can be similarly estimated accurately in an analog fashion for known target sizes through proportionality calculations.

Holdover, for estimating vertical point of aim offset required for bullet drop compensation on level terrain, and horizontal windage offset, for estimating side to side point of aim offsets required for wind effect corrections, can similarly be compensated for through using approximations based on the wind speed, from observing flags or other objects, by a trained user through using the reticle marks. The less-commonly used holdunder, used for shooting on sloping terrain, can even be estimated by an appropriately-skilled user with a reticle-equipped sight, once both the slope of the terrain and the slant range to target are known.

There are two main types of reticle constructions: wire reticle and etched reticle. Wire reticles are the oldest type of reticles and are made out of metal wire or thread, mounted in an optically appropriate position in the telescopic sight's tube. Etched reticles are an optic element, often a glass plate, with inked patterns etched onto it, and are mounted as an integrated part of the lightpath. When backlit through the ocular, a wire reticle will reflect incoming light and cannot present a fully opaque (black) reticle with high contrast. An etched reticle will stay fully opaque (black) if backlit.

=== Patterns ===
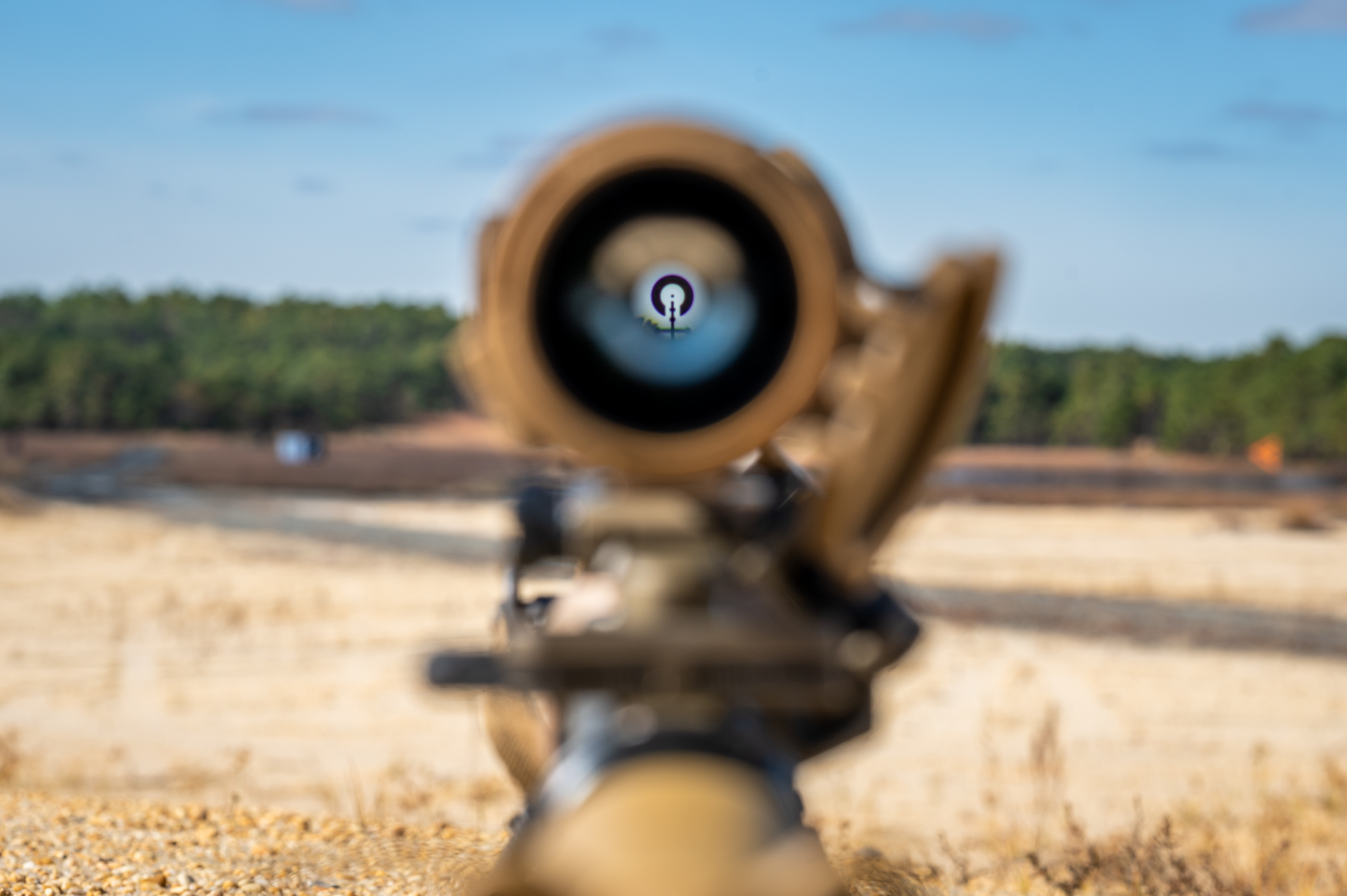
A "horseshoe-dot" reticle (with BDC/rangefinder lines below)

Reticle patterns can be as simple as a round target dot, a small cross, a diamond, a chevron and/or a circle in the center (in some prism sights and reflex/holographic sights), or a pointed vertical bar. However, most reticles are based on a crosshair pattern that uses both horizontal and vertical lines to provide better visual references.

==== Vertical bar reticles ====
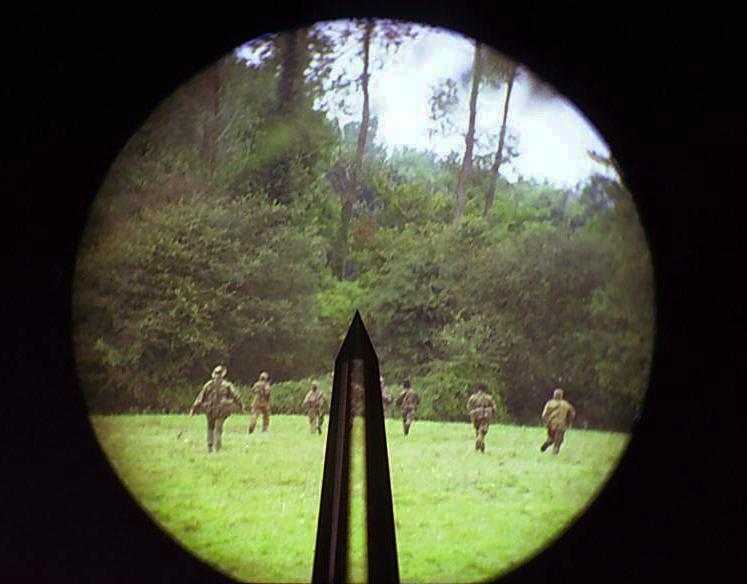
The "obelisk" reticle of a SUSAT prism sight

Some early reticle designs use a single (typically pointed) vertical bar or "obelisk" that essentially imitates the front post on traditional iron sights. Some such reticles have additional horizontal lines that supplement the vertical bar in a "T"-like pattern to help the user quickly align the aim with the target. Examples of such designs include the famous "German #1" reticle used on the Wehrmacht ZF41 sights during the Second World War, the SVD-pattern reticle used on the Soviet PSO-1 sights during the Cold War, and the British SUSAT prism scope used on the SA80-series bullpup rifles.

==== Crosshairs ====
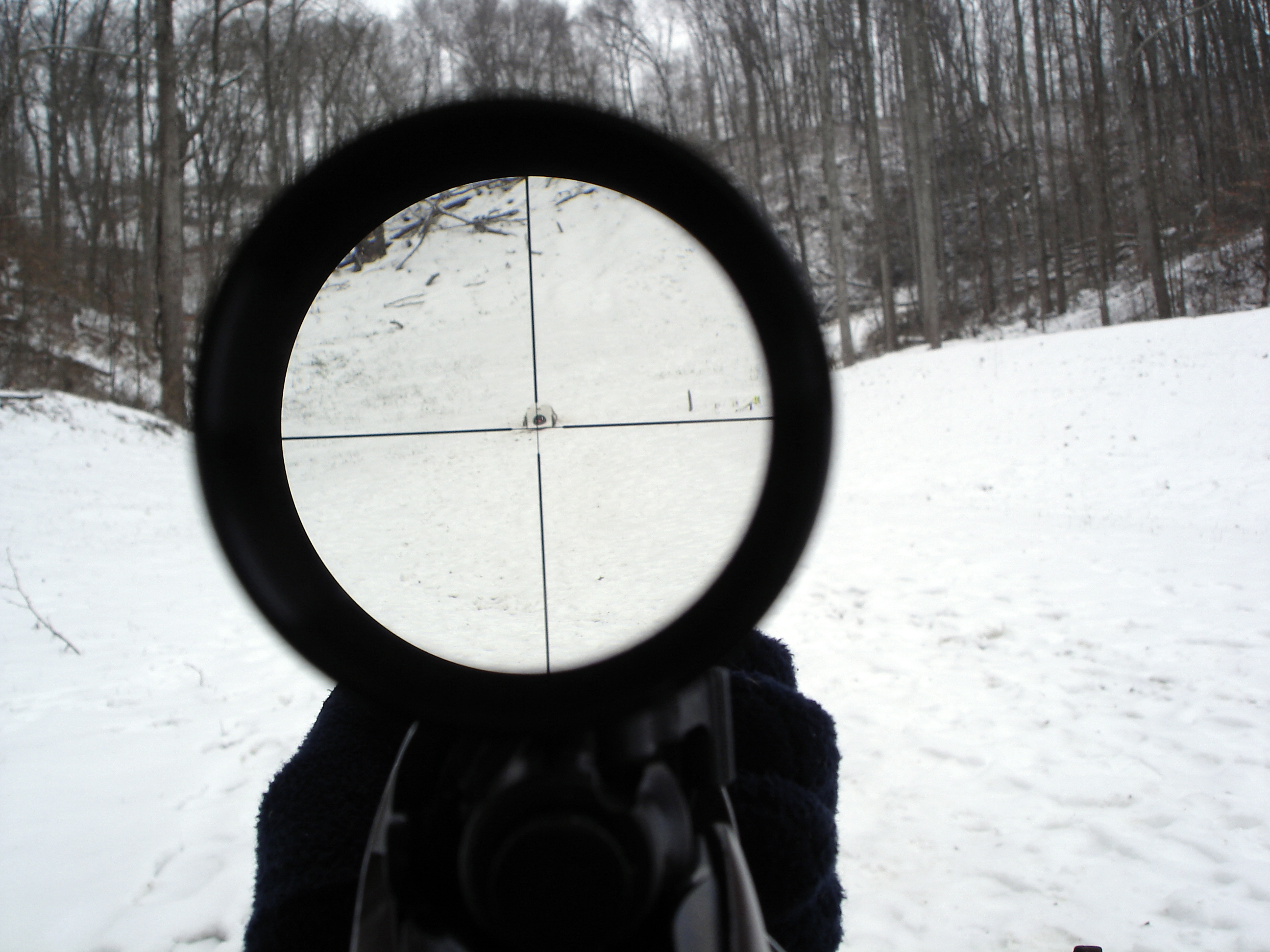
Viewing through a duplex crosshair reticle

The crosshair is the most rudimentary reticle, represented as a pair of smooth, perpendicularly intersecting lines in the shape of a "+", and the crosshair center ( the "zero") is used for aiming the weapon. The crosshair lines geometrically resemble the X- and Y-axis of the Cartesian coordinate system, which the shooter can use as a simple reference for rough horizontal and vertical calibrations.

Plain crosshair reticles do not have any graduated markings, and thus are unsuitable for stadiametric rangefinding. However some crosshair designs have thickened outer sections that help with aiming in contrast-poor situations when the fine crosshair center cannot be clearly seen. These "thin-thick" crosshair reticles, known as duplex reticles, can also be used for some rough estimations if the transition point between thinner and thicker lines are at a defined distance from the center, as seen in designs such as the common 30/30 reticles (both the fine horizontal and vertical crosshair lines are 30 MOAs in length at 4× magnification before transition to thicker lines). There can be additional features such as enlarged center dot (frequently also illuminated), concentric circle (solid or broken/dashed), chevron, stadia bars, or a combination of the above, that are added to a crosshair to help with easier aiming.

==== Milling reticles ====
A typical (stadiametric) rangefinding reticle used by military snipers. The Mil-dots can be seen on the cross hairs. The four horizontal bars over the horizontal line are also intended for (quick) ranging purposes.

• If the helmeted head of a person (≈ 0.25 m tall) fits between the fourth bar and the horizontal line, the person is at approximately 100 meters' distance. • When the upper part of the body of a person (≈ 1 m tall) fits under the fourth bar, they stand at approximately 400 meters' distance.

Many modern reticles are designed for (stadiametric) rangefinding purposes. Perhaps the most popular and well-known ranging reticle is the mil-dot reticle, which consists of a duplex crosshair with small dots marking each milliradian (or mil) intervals from the center. An alternative variant uses perpendicular hash lines instead of dots, and is known as the mil-hash reticle. Such graduated reticles, along with those with MOA-based increments, are collectively and unofficially called "milling reticles", and have gained significant acceptance in NATO and other military and law enforcement organizations.

Mil-based reticles, being decimal in graduations, are by far more prevalent due to the ease and reliability of ranging calculations with the ubiquitous metric units, as each milliradian at each meter of distance simply corresponds to a subtension of 1 millimeter; while MOA-based reticles are more popular in civilian usage favoring imperial units (e.g. in the United States), because by coincidence 1 MOA at 100 yards (the most common sight-in distance) is about 1.0472 inch (π÷3), which can be confidently rounded to 1 inch.

To allow methodological uniformity, accurate mental calculation and efficient communication between spotters and shooters in sniper teams, mil-based sights are typically matched by elevation/windage adjustments in 0.1 mil increments. There are however military and shooting sport sights that use coarser or finer reticle increments.

By means of a mathematical formula "[Target size] ÷ [Number of mil intervals] × 1000 = Distance", the user can easily calculate the distance to a target, as a 1-meter object is going to be exactly 1 milliradian at a 1000-meter distance. For example, if the user sees an object known to be 1.8 meters tall as something 3 mils tall through the telescopic sight, the distance to that object will be 600 meters (1.8 ÷ 3 × 1000 = 600).

==== Holdover reticles ====
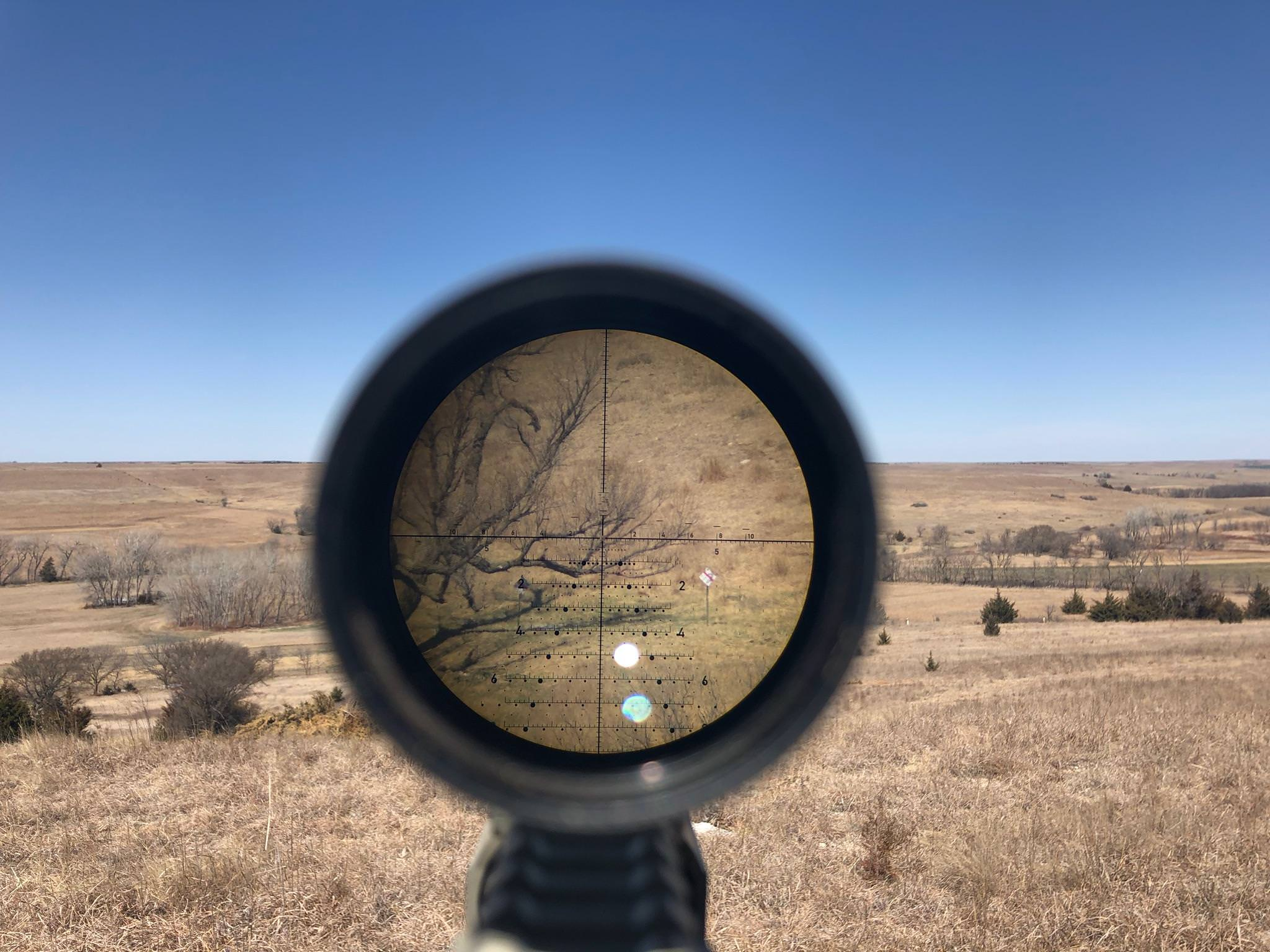
The "holdover" dot matrix on the Horus TReMoR reticle

Some milling reticles have additional marking patterns in the bottom two quadrants, consisting of elaborate arrays of neatly spaced fine dots, "+" marks or hashed lines (usually at 0.2 mil or ½ MOA intervals), to provide accurate references for compensating bullet drops and wind drifts by simply aiming above (i.e., hold the aim over the target) and upwind of the target (i.e., deflection shooting, or Kentucky windage). This type of reticles, designed to hold the aim high and away from the target, are therefore called holdover reticles. Such aiming technique can quickly correct for ballistic deviations without needing to manually readjust the sight's zero, thus enabling the shooter to place rapid, reliably calibrated follow-up shots.

When shooting at extended distances, the farther the target, the greater the bullet drops and wind drifts that need to be compensated. Because of this, the reference arrays of holdover reticles are typically much wider at the lower portion, shaping into an isosceles triangle/trapezium that resembles the canopy of a spruce, the ornamental tree traditionally used to make Christmas trees. Holdover reticles therefore are colloquially also known as "Christmas tree reticles". Well-known examples of these reticles include GAP G2DMR, Horus TReMoR series and H58/H59, Vortex EBR-2B and Kahles AMR.

=== Reticle focal plane ===
Telescopic sights based on image erector lenses (used to present to the user with an upright image) have two planes of focus where a reticle can be placed: at the focal plane between the objective and the image erector lens system (the First Focal Plane (FFP)), or the focal plane between the image erector lens system and the eyepiece (the Second Focal Plane (SFP)). On fixed power telescopic sights there is no significant difference, but on variable power telescopic sights a first focal plane reticle expands and shrinks along with the rest of the image as the magnification is adjusted, while a second focal plane reticle would appear the same size and shape to the user as the target image grows and shrinks. In general, the majority of modern variable-power sights are SFP unless stated otherwise.

The main disadvantage of SFP designs comes with the use of range-finding reticles such as mil-dot. Since the proportion between the reticle and the target is dependent on selected magnification, such reticles only work properly at one magnification level, typically the highest power. Some long-range shooters and military snipers use fixed-power telescopic sights to eliminate this potential for error. Some SFP sights take advantage of this aspect by having the shooter adjust magnification until the target fits a certain way inside the reticle and then extrapolate the range based on the power adjustment. Some Leupold hunting sights with duplex reticles allow range estimation to a White-tailed deer buck by adjusting magnification until the area between the backbone and the brisket fits between the crosshairs and the top thick post of the reticle. Once that is done, the range be read from the scale printed on the magnification adjustment ring.

Although FFP designs are not susceptible to magnification-induced errors, they have their own disadvantages. It's challenging to design a reticle that is visible through the entire range of magnification: a reticle that looks fine and crisp at 24× magnification may be very difficult to see at 6×. On the other hand, a reticle that is easy to see at 6× may be too thick at 24× to make precision shots. Shooting in low light conditions also tends to require either illumination or a bold reticle, along with lower magnification to maximize light gathering. In practice, these issues tend to significantly reduce the available magnification range on FFP sights compared to SFP, and FFP sights are much more expensive compared to SFP models of similar quality. Most high-end optics manufacturers leave the choice between a FFP or SFP mounted reticle to the customer or have sight product models with both setups.

Variable-power telescopic sights with FFP reticles have no problems with point of impact shifts. Variable-power telescopic sights with SFP reticles can have slight point-of-impact shifts through their magnification range, caused by the positioning of the reticle in the mechanical zoom mechanism in the rear part of the telescopic sight. Normally these impact shifts are insignificant, but accuracy-oriented users, who wish to use their telescopic sight trouble-free at several magnification levels, often opt for FFP reticles.

=== Reticle illumination ===
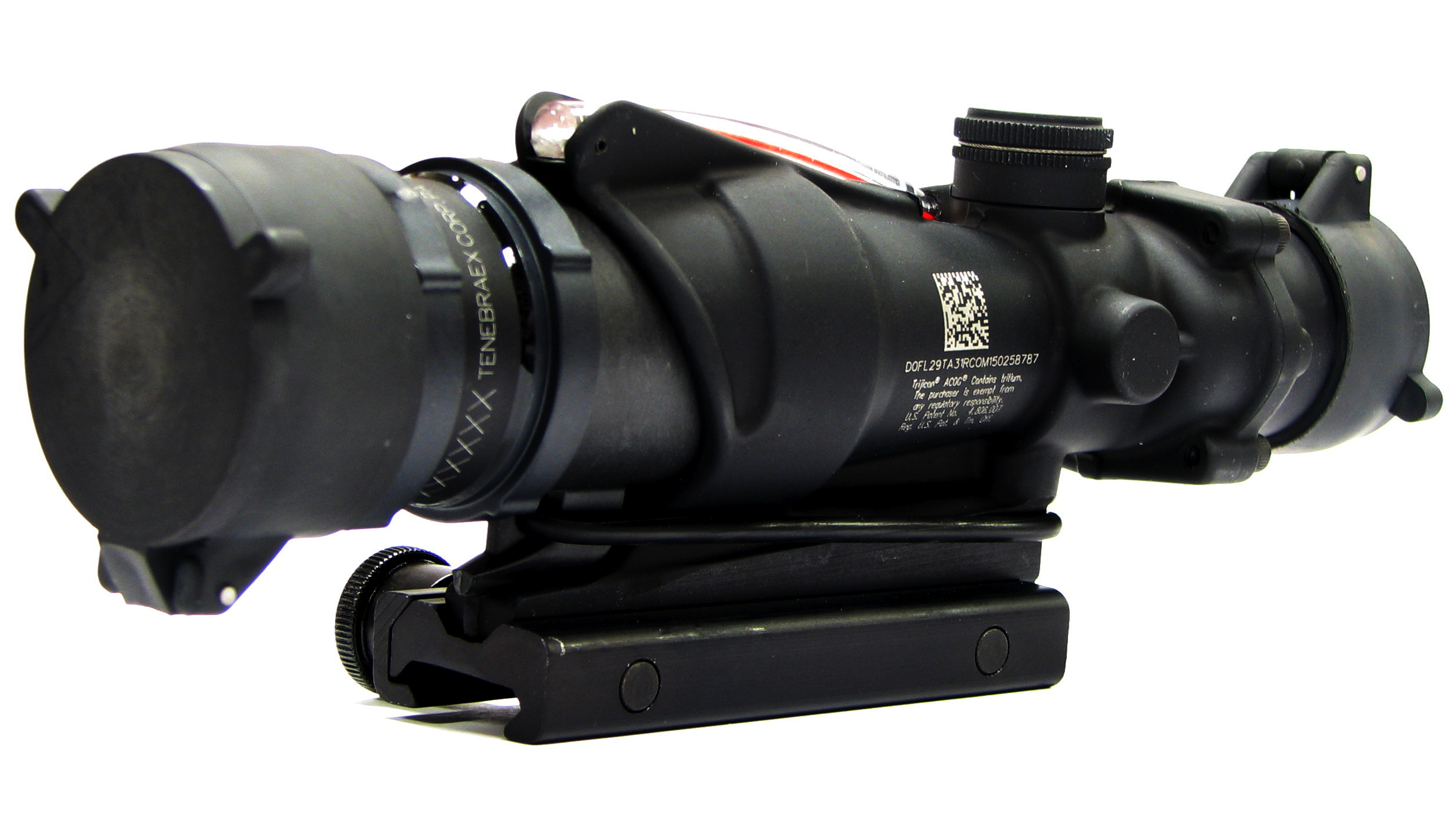
TA31RCO-M150CPO 4×32 ACOG sight using a combination of fiber optics (visible on top) and self-luminous tritium for reticle illumination

Either type of reticle can be illuminated for use in low-light or daytime conditions. With any illuminated low-light reticle, it is essential that its brightness can be adjusted. A reticle that is too bright will cause glare in the operator's eye, interfering with their ability to see in low-light conditions. This is because the pupil of the human eye closes quickly upon receiving any source of light. Most illuminated reticles provide adjustable brightness settings to adjust the reticle precisely to the ambient light.

Illumination is usually provided by a battery-powered LED, though other electric light sources can be used. The light is projected forward through the sight, and reflects off the back surface of the reticle. Red is the most common colour used, as it least impedes the shooter's natural night vision. This illumination method can be used to provide both daytime and low-light conditions reticle illumination.

Radioactive isotopes such as tritium can also be used as a light source to provide an illuminated reticle for low-light condition aiming. In sights such as the SUSAT or Elcan C79 Optical Sight tritium-illuminated reticles are used. The Trijicon Corporation, famous for their ACOG prism sights that are adopted by various assault infantry branches of the United States military, uses tritium in their combat and hunting-grade firearm optics. The tritium light source has to be replaced every 8–12 years, since it gradually loses brightness due to radioactive decay.

With fiber optics, ambient (day)light can be collected and directed to an illuminated daytime reticle. Fiber-optics reticles automatically interact with the ambient light level that dictates the brightness of the reticle. Trijicon uses fiber optics combined with other low-light conditions illumination methods in their AccuPoint telescopic sights and some of their ACOG sights models.

== Additional features ==
=== Bullet drop compensation ===
Bullet drop compensation (BDC, sometimes referred alternatively as ballistic elevation) is a feature available on some telescopic sights, usually those used by more tactically oriented semi-automatic and assault rifles. The feature provides pre-determined reference markings for various distances (referred to as "bullet drops") on the reticle or (much less commonly) on the elevation turret, which gives reasonably accurate estimations of potential gravitational deviation upon the bullet in flat-firing scenarios, so the shooter can proactively adjust their aim to compensate without needing to trial with missed shots or dealing with complex ballistic calculation.

The BDC feature is usually tuned only for the ballistic trajectory of a particular gun-cartridge combination with a predefined projectile weight/type, muzzle velocity and air density. Military prism sights featuring BDC reticles (e.g. the ACOG) or elevation turrets with range markings (e.g. PSO-1) are fairly common, though commercial manufacturers also offer the option to install a BDC reticle or elevation turret as long as the customer supplies the necessary ballistic data.

Since the usage of standardized ammunition is an important prerequisite to match the BDC feature to the external ballistic behaviour of the employed projectiles, telescopic sights with BDC are generally intended to assist with field-shooting at targets within varying medium to longer ranges rather than precise long range shooting. With increasing range, inevitable BDC-induced errors will occur when the environmental and meteorological circumstances deviate from the predefined circumstances for which the BDC was calibrated. Marksmen can be trained to understand the main forces acting on the projectile and their effect on their particular gun and ammunition and the effects of external factors at longer ranges to counter these errors.

=== Parallax compensation ===
Simple animation demonstrating the extent of noticeable parallax shift with eye movements in telescopic sights with and without parallax compensation.

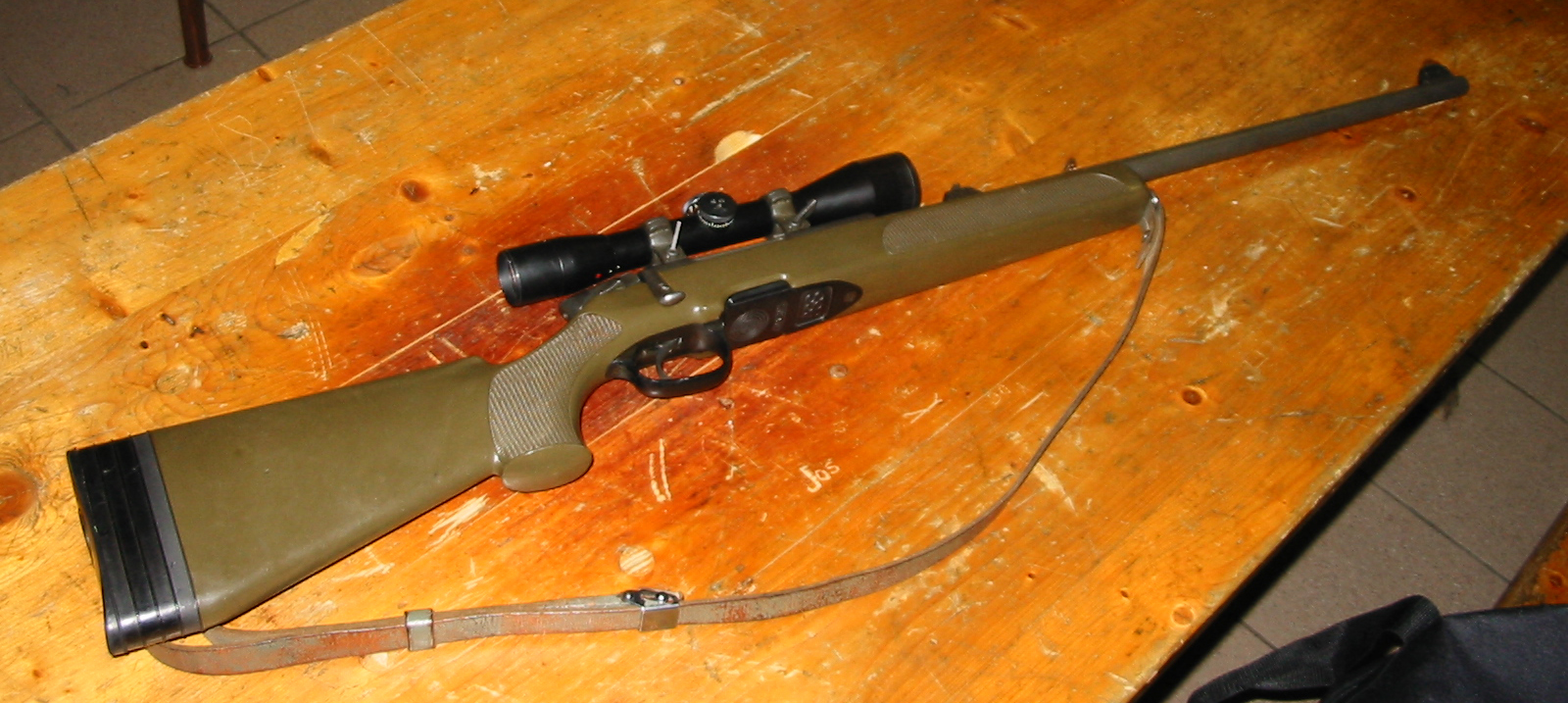
An Austrian military issued Steyr SSG 69 sniper rifle with Kahles ZF 69 6×42 mm telescopic sight adjusted to be parallax free at 300 meters (328 yd)

Parallax problems result from the target image projected from the objective not being coplanar with the reticle. If the target and the reticle are not coplanar (i.e. focal plane of the target is either in front of or behind the reticle), when the shooter's pupil position changes (often due to small alterations in head alignment) behind the eyepiece, the target will produce a different parallax to the reticle image. This parallax difference will produce an apparent movement of the reticle "floating" over the target, known as the parallax shift. This optical effect causes aiming errors that can make a shooter miss a small target at a distance, due to actually aiming at a different spot from the assumed point of aim. It can also lead to unreliabilities when zeroing the gun.

To eliminate parallax-induced aiming errors, telescopic sights can be equipped with a parallax compensation mechanism which basically consists of a movable optical element that can shift the target/reticle focus back or forward into exactly the same optical plane. There are two main methods to achieve this.

- By shifting the focus of the target image. This is typically achieved by making the objective lens group of the telescopic sight adjustable so the target focus can be moved into coplanarity with a fixed reticle. These models are often called adjustable objective (AO or A/O for short) models.

Occasionally, a side-focus design (see below) might be used with a fixed reticle within the eyepiece, onto which the second focal plane (SFP) of the target image is shifted by an adjustable erector lens group. While side focus designs are generally considered more user-friendly than AO designs, having an SFP reticle is less ideal due to it inherently not staying true to magnification changes.

- By shifting the reticle position. This is typically achieved by having a movable reticle at the front of an adjustable erector lens tube, which moves forward and back in coordination with other erector lenses to shift itself into coplanarity with the first focal plane (FFP) of the target image. Because the erector tube is adjusted via an external adjustment wheel typically located on the left side of the sight's tube, these designs are called side focus (SF or S/F for short) or sidewheel models. This type of design is more costly and technically sophisticated to manufacture, but generally more favored over the AO designs by users due to better ergonomics, because unlike AO models (which need to be read from the top and adjusted by reaching all the way to the front of the sight) the SF turret setting can be conveniently read from behind and adjusted with minimal movement of the user's head.

A much less commonly seen design, used exclusively in fixed-power sights, is to have a movable SFP reticle adjusted by a coaxial wheel located just in front of the eyepiece, where the magnification adjustment wheel (which is absent in fixed-power sights) would otherwise be located. This is known as the rear focus (RF or R/F for short) design, and is also a somewhat favored alternative to AO designs in fixed-power sights due to the rear position of the adjustment wheel being nearer and more convenient to the user.

Most telescopic sights lack parallax compensation due to cost-benefit, as they can perform very acceptably without such refinement since most applications do not demand very high precision, so adding extra production cost for parallax compensation is not justified. For example, in most hunting situations, the "kill zone" on the game (where the vital organs are located) can be so forgivingly big that a shot hitting anywhere within the upper torso guarantees a successful kill. In these sights, the manufacturers often design for a "parallax-free" distance that best suits their intended usage. Typical standard parallax-free distances for hunting telescopic sights are 100 yards (91 m) or 100 meters (109 yd) as most sport hunting rarely exceed 300 yards (270 m).

Some long-range target and "tactical-style" sights without parallax compensation may be adjusted to be parallax-free at ranges up to 300 yards (270 m) to make them better suited for the longer ranges. Telescopic sights used by rimfire guns, shotguns and muzzleloaders that are rarely fired beyond 100 yards (91 m) ranges will have shorter parallax settings, commonly 50 yards (46 m) for rimfire sights and 100 yards (91 m) for shotguns and muzzleloaders. However, due to parallax effect being more pronounced at close distances (as a result of foreshortening), sights for airguns (which are commonly used at very short ranges) almost always have parallax compensation, frequently an adjustable objective design, which may adjust down to as near as 3 yards (2.7 m).

The reason why telescopic sights intended for short range use are often equipped with parallax compensation is that at short range (and at high magnification) parallax errors become proportionally more noticeable. A typical telescopic sight objective lens has a focal length of 100 millimeters (3.9 in). An optically ideal 10× sight in this example has been perfectly parallax corrected at 1,000 meters (1,094 yd) and functions flawlessly at that distance. If the same sight is used at 100 meters (109 yd) the target picture would be projected (1000 m / 100 m) / 100 mm = 0.1 mm behind the reticle plane. At 10× magnification the error would be 10 × 0.1 mm = 1 mm at the ocular. If the same telescopic sight was used at 10 meters (11 yd) the target picture would be (1000 m / 10 m) / 100 mm = 1 mm projected behind the reticle plane. When 10× magnified the error would be 10 × 1 mm = 10 mm at the ocular.

== Accessories ==
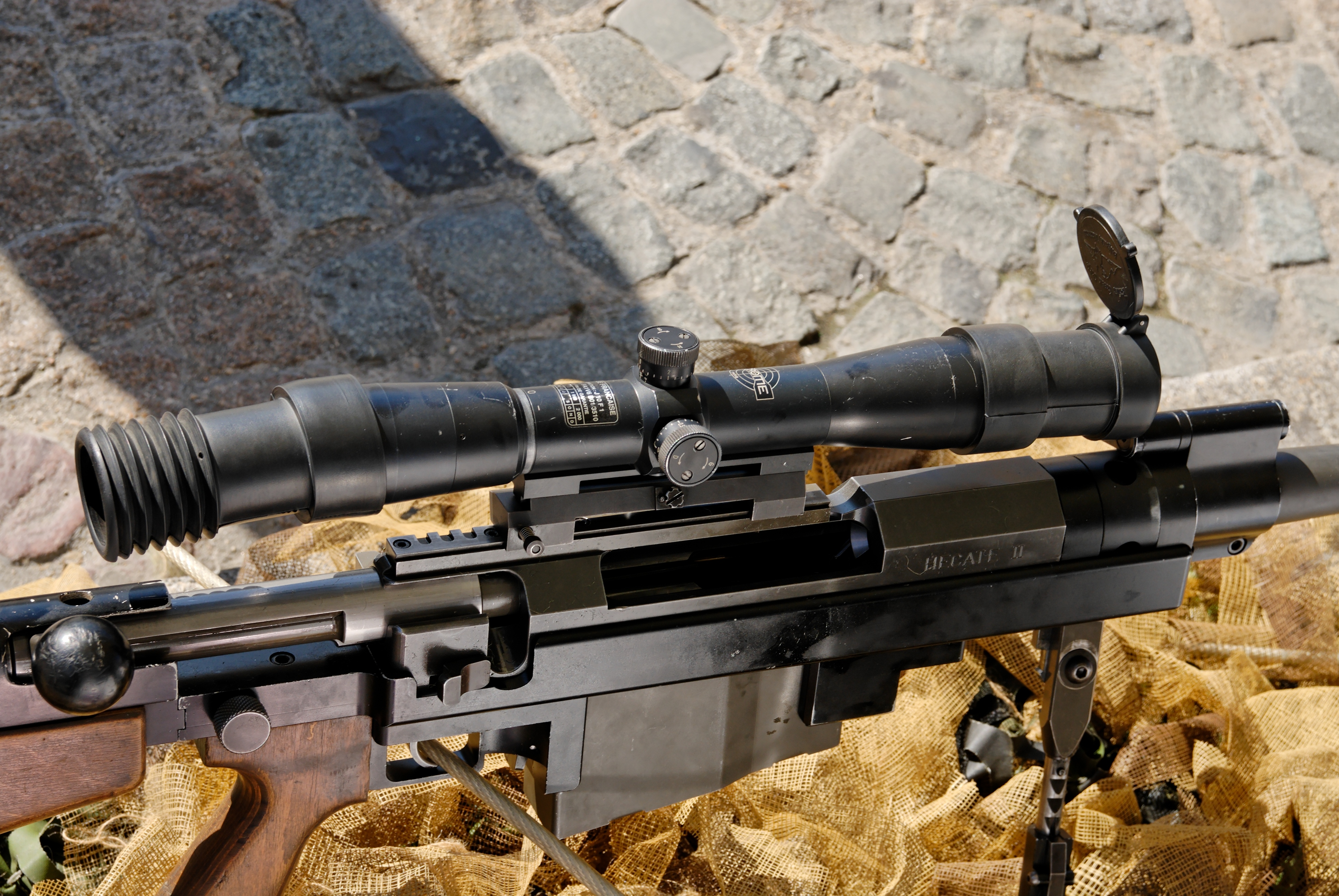
Scrome LTE J10 F1 with a lens hood mounted at the ocular and a flip-open cover at the objective mounted on a PGM Hécate II

Typical accessories for telescopic sights are:

- Lens hood is a tubular extension mounted on the objective and/or ocular ends to shade light and reduce/eliminate glare. The lens hood mounted on the eyepiece, often called an eyecup, is often made from corrugated silicone rubber for resting against the user's eye socket, and can also help avoid recoil-induced collisional injuries and maintain a consistent eye box. Some objective-mounted lens hoods that extend the full length over the gun barrel can improve image quality by shielding out heat-induced mirage ("heat waves" or aberrations resulting from a hot gun barrel).
- Lens covers or lens caps protect the objective and/or ocular lens surface against foul weather and accidental damage. There are slide-over, bikini and flip-open type covers, without or with transparent covering material.
- Optical filters such as grey, yellow and polarising filters to optimize image quality in various lighting conditions.
- Anti-reflection device (ARD) or KillFlash is a usually honeycomb-mesh cover used to filter out light reflections from the objective lens, which could compromise the shooter's position.
- Laser filters protect the operator against being dazzled/blinded by potential laser light sources. These filters are often an internal part in the assembly of lens elements.
- Scope cover, a semi-soft pouch that protects the sight from accidental collisions or the elements during transit and storage.

== Optronic technologies ==
=== Integrated laser rangefinder ===
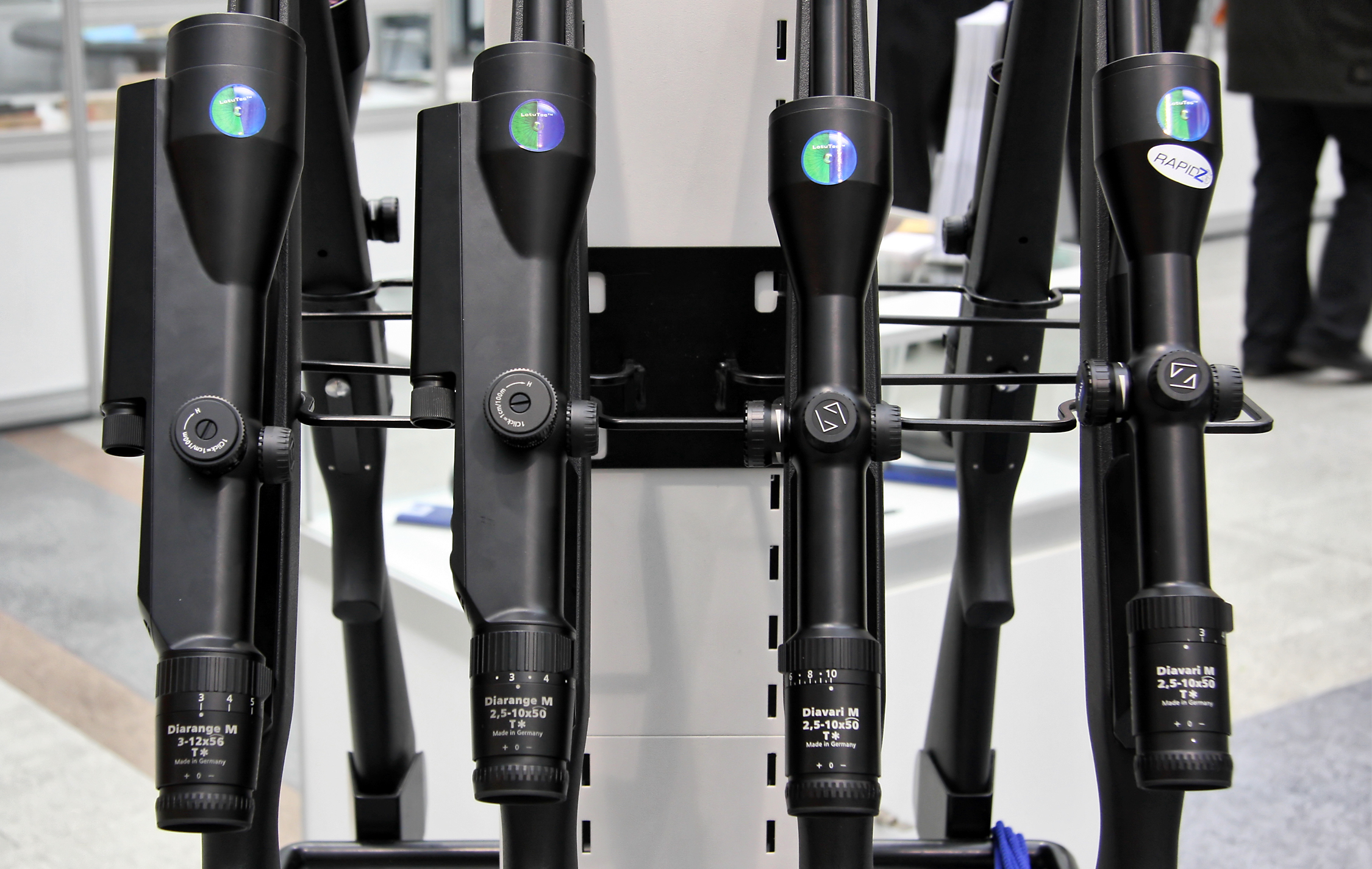
Two Diarange telescopic sights with integrated laser rangefinders

In 1997 Swarovski Optik introduced the LRS series telescopic sight, the first sight on the civilian market with an integrated laser rangefinder. The LRS 2-12x50 sight can measure ranges up to 600 m (660 yd). The LRS sights are currently (2008) not produced anymore, but sights with similar features are commercially available from several manufacturers.

=== Ballistic support devices ===
An integrated ballistic computer/telescopic sight system known as BORS has been developed by the Barrett Firearms Company and became commercially available around 2007. The BORS module is in essence an electronic Bullet Drop Compensation (BDC) sensor/calculator package intended for long-range sniping out to 2,500 m (2,700 yd) for some telescopic sight models made by Leupold and Nightforce.

To establish the appropriate elevation setting the shooter needs to enter the ammunition type into the BORS (using touch pads on the BORS console) determine the range (either mechanically or through a laser rangefinder) and crank the elevation knob on the sight until the proper range appears in the BORS display. The BORS automatically determines the air density, as well as the cant or tilt in the rifle itself, and incorporates these environmental factors into its elevation calculations.

The SAM (Shooter-supporting Attachment Module) measures and provides aiming and ballistic relevant data and displays this to the user in the ocular of the Zeiss 6–24×72 telescopic sight it is developed for. The SAM has different sensors integrated (temperature, air pressure, shooting angle) and calculates the actual ballistic compensation. All indications are displayed in the ocular. It memorizes up to 4 different ballistics and 4 different firing tables. So it is possible to use 1 SAM with four total different loads or weapons without an additional adjustment.

=== CCD and LCD technology ===
Some modern scopes have a transparent display built inside the eyepiece, which allows digital data from a microprocessor to be superimposed over the optical target image to create an augmented reality. Some newer models, such as the SIG Sauer BDX series, even allow ballistic information from rangefinders, wind meters and ballistic calculators to be synchronously shared among multiple scopes.

A totally different approach recently developed, which has been applied in the ELCAN DigitalHunter series and the ATN X-Sight series, essentially uses a video camera system to digitally capture, process and display a virtual reality image of the target into a small flat panel display built inside the eyepiece, often with additional built-in rangefinder, ballistic calculator, signal filters, memory card and/or wireless access smart device interface to create a smart scope that can store/share data with other mobile devices. The ELCAN DigitalHunter, for instance, combines CCD and LCD technology with electronic ballistics compensation, automatic video capture, 4-field selectable reticles and customizable reticles.

In 2008, a DigitalHunter Day/Night Riflescope that uses infrared captured by the CCD to enhance low-light capabilities became available. It is also possible to attach infrared light sources to use such sights in total darkness, though the image quality, and overall performance is often poor. Some jurisdictions however forbid or limit the use of night vision devices for civilian use.

== Mounting ==
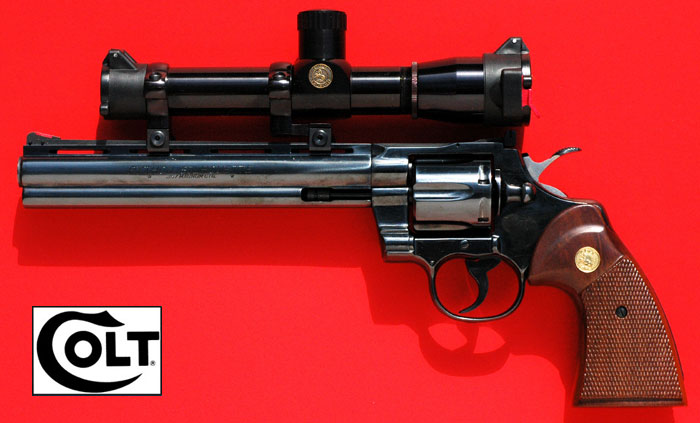
Colt Python Silhouette, with 8-inch barrel, factory telescopic sight, and case – 500 made in 1981 by the Colt Custom Gun Shop.

As very few firearms come with factory-built telescopic sights (the Steyr AUG, SAR 21 and H&K G36 being exceptions), mounting a separately acquired sight to a firearm requires additional accessories. A typical sight mounting system consists of two parts, the scope rings and the scope base. The mounting generally positions the telescopic sight axis without cant over the receiver and bore center axis, to make sighting in and the use of ballistic tracking at various ranges for the user as easy as possible.

=== Scope rings ===
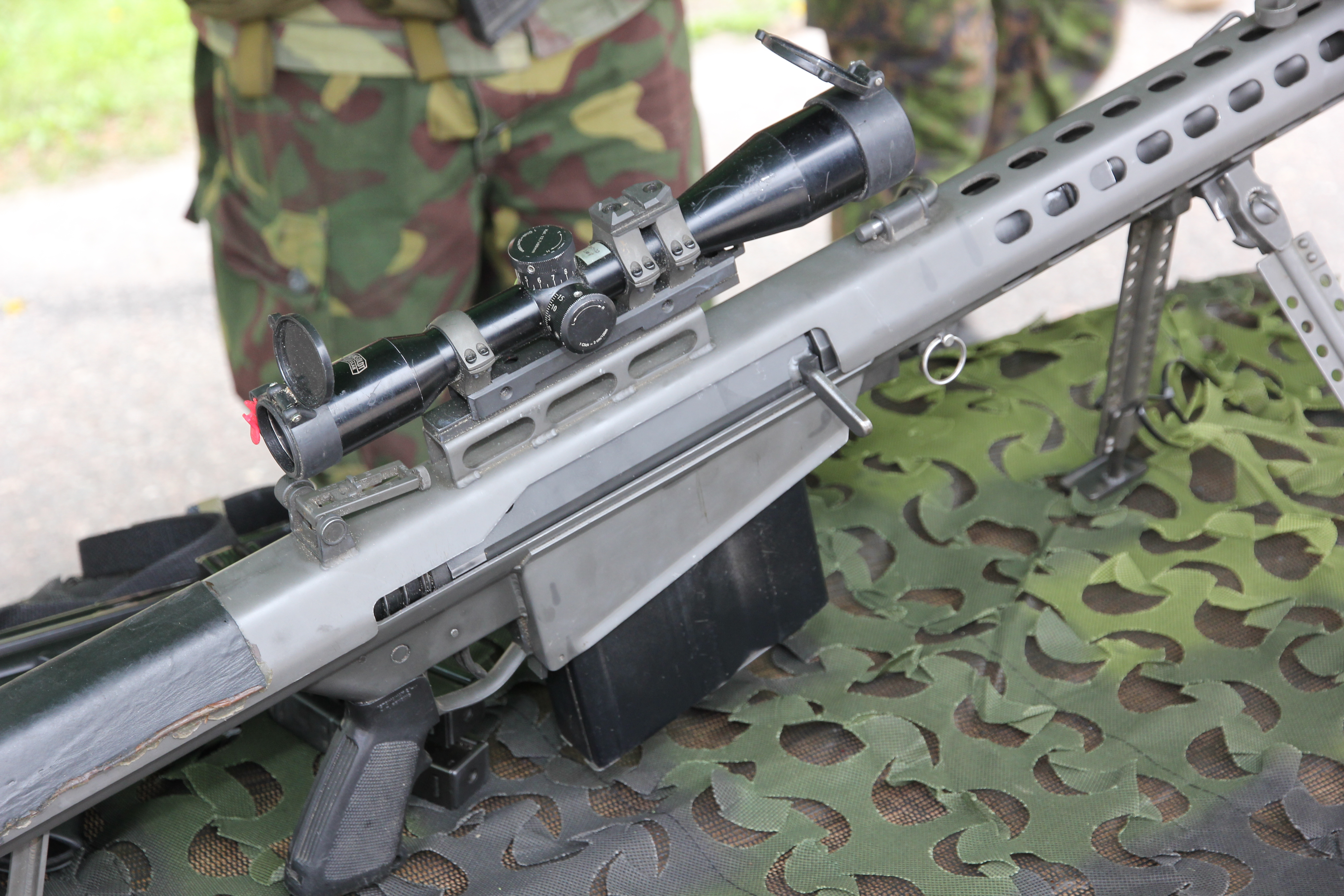
A mount with three scope rings for telescopic sight interface and Picatinny rail for receiver interface.

Because the majority of telescopic sights do not come with a built-in design for direct attachment onto something, intermediate mounting accessories are needed. Because telescopic sights universally have a round main tube, the standard mounting method is to use scope rings, which are essentially round metal pipe shoes that clamp firmly onto the telescopic sight body. Most commonly, a pair of scope rings are used, though unusually short telescopic sights occasionally do use only a single scope ring. There are also one-piece mounting accessories with two integral rings, called scope mounts, that can even offer "cantilever" or "offset" mounting (leaning off to one end, away from the center).

The scope ring size (inner diameter) must correspond closely to the outer diameter of the telescopic sight main tube, or else the telescopic sight would either be loosely mounted, or sustain compressive fatigue due to being clamped too tightly. The three most common ring sizes are:

- 1 in (25.4 mm), offers a lower production cost compared to 30 mm main tubes, but allows for less elevation adjustment than what is possible with a 30 mm tube.
- 30 mm, the most common main tube standard today, and therefore has the widest range of mounting solutions.
- 34 mm, which has become a new standard main tube size for tactical rifle telescopic sights where more elevation is needed than with a standard 30 mm tube.

=== Scope bases ===
The scope base is the attachment interface on the rifle's receiver, onto which the scope rings or scope mount are fixed. Early telescopic sights almost all have the rings that are fastened directly into tapped screw holes on the receiver, hence having no additional scope base other than the receiver top itself. While this is simple and cheap, it comes with the problem that any misalignment of the screw holes can cause the scope rings to exert bending stress on the telescopic sight body, and often requires the inner edges of the rings to be lapped before the telescopic sight can be safely mounted. Some scope bases, such as Leupold & Stevens's proprietary STD mounts, use socketed bases screw-fastened to the receiver and a twistlock-like interface to secure the accompanied scope rings.

An alternative design that has remained popular since the early 20th century is the dovetail rail, which is a straight metal flange with an inverted trapezoid cross-section (similar to the dovetail joint used in woodworking). When mounting a telescopic sight, dovetail-interfaced scope rings can be slid onto the rail at any desired position, and friction-fastened via set screws, or clamped firm with screw-tightened plates called "grabbers". Due to the relative ease of machining a reliably straight metal bar, dovetail rails pretty much eliminated the misalignment concerns of the screw-and-hole scope rings. Most dovetail rails are made by cutting triangular grooves into the receiver top, but there are aftermarket rails that can be installed with screws into the aforementioned scope ring holes. The top of receivers featuring an integral dovetail rail can feature shape connection drillings that function as one or more recoil lug(s) interface(s) to prevent undesired backward and forward sliding movement.

Some manufacturers provide integral bases on many of their firearms; an example of such a firearm is the Ruger Super Redhawk revolver. The most commonly encountered mounting systems are the 3/8 inch (9.5 mm) and the 11 mm dovetail rails (sometimes called "tip-off mounts") commonly found on rimfires and air guns, the Weaver rails, the mil-spec MIL-STD-1913 Picatinny rail (STANAG 2324), and the NATO Accessory Rail (STANAG 4694). Ruger uses a proprietary scope base system, though adapters are available to convert the Ruger bases into other Weaver-type bases.

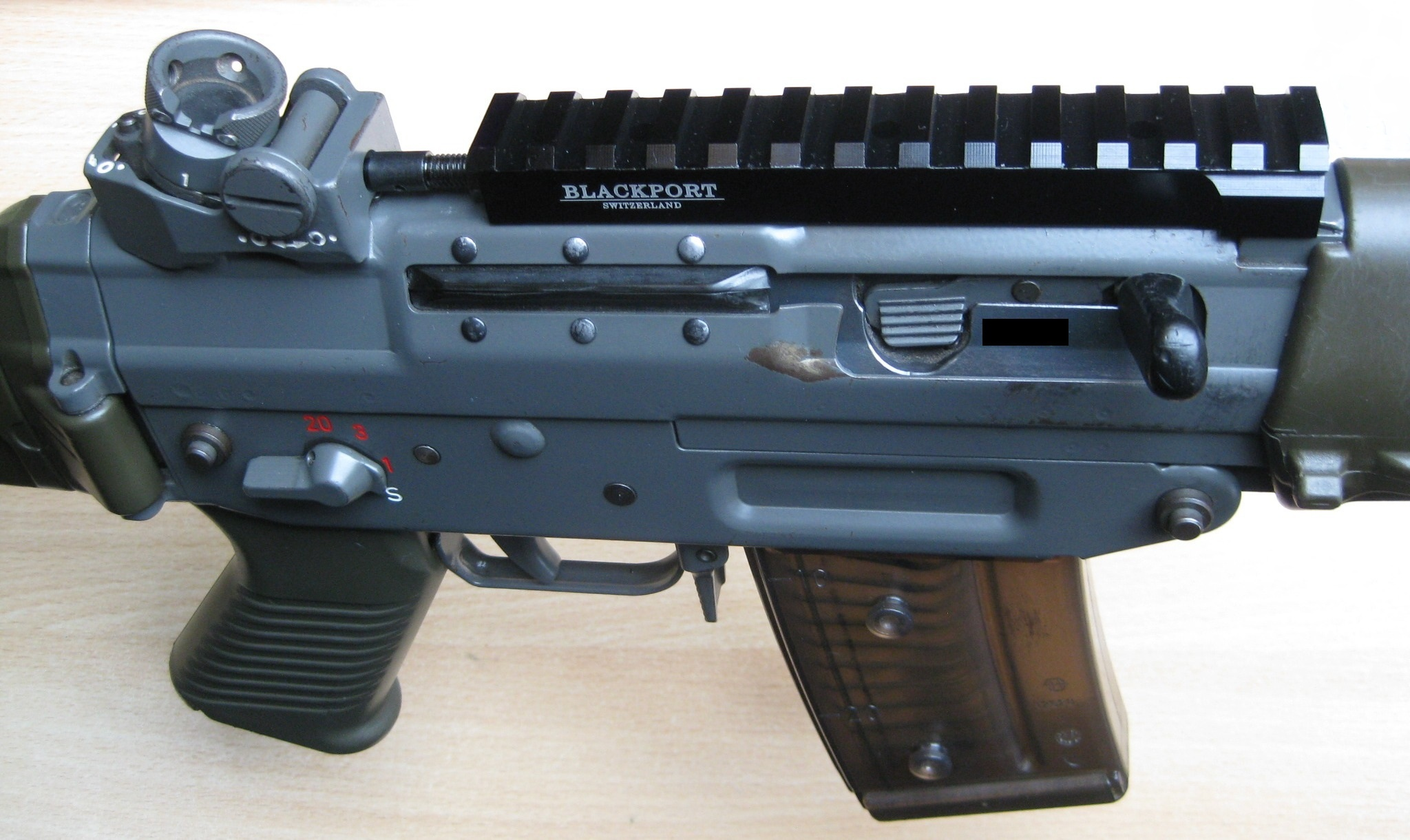
Picatinny rail on a rifle receiver for mounting sights.

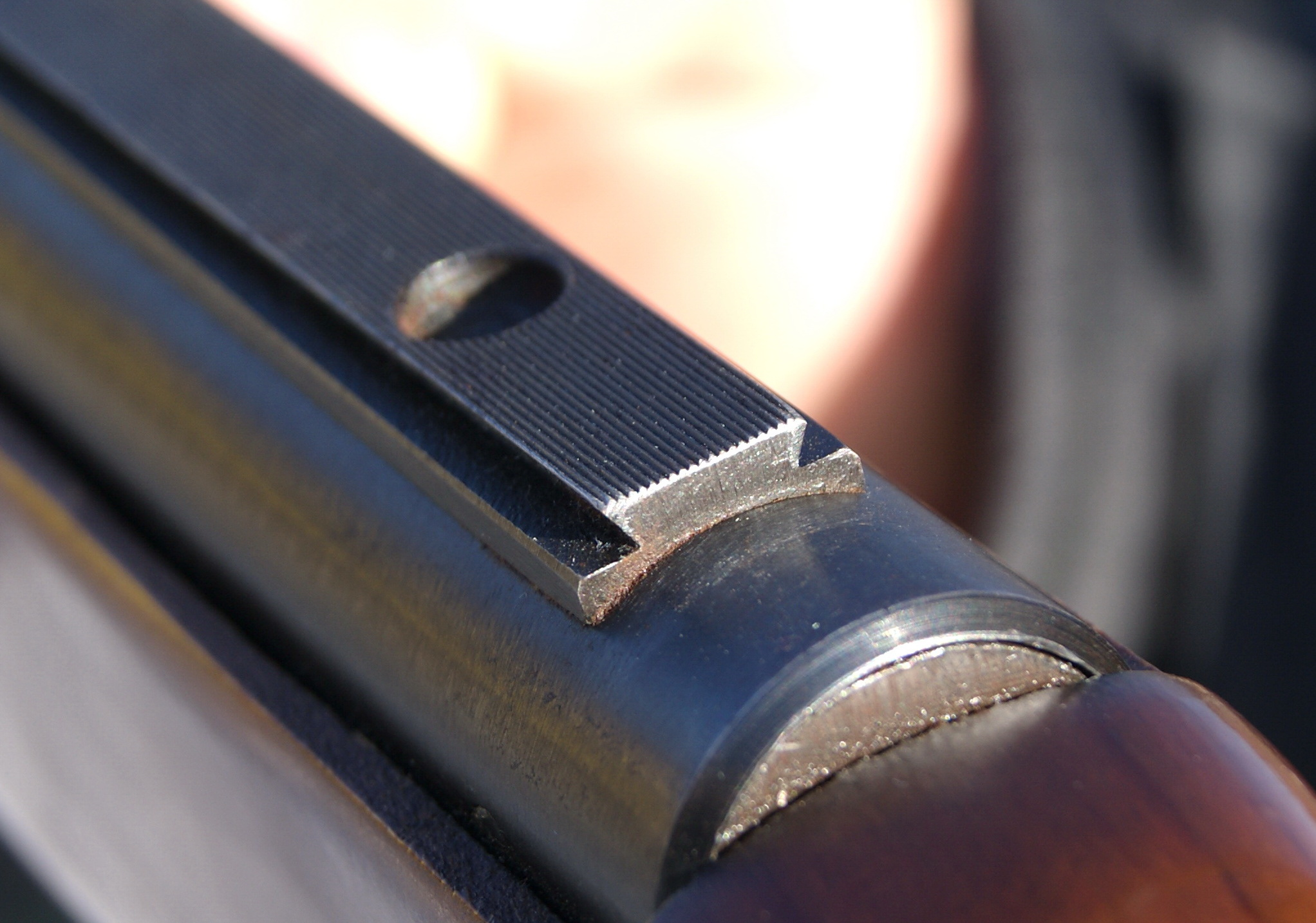
A dovetail rail on a rifle receiver for mounting sights with a drilling on top for an additional shape connection.

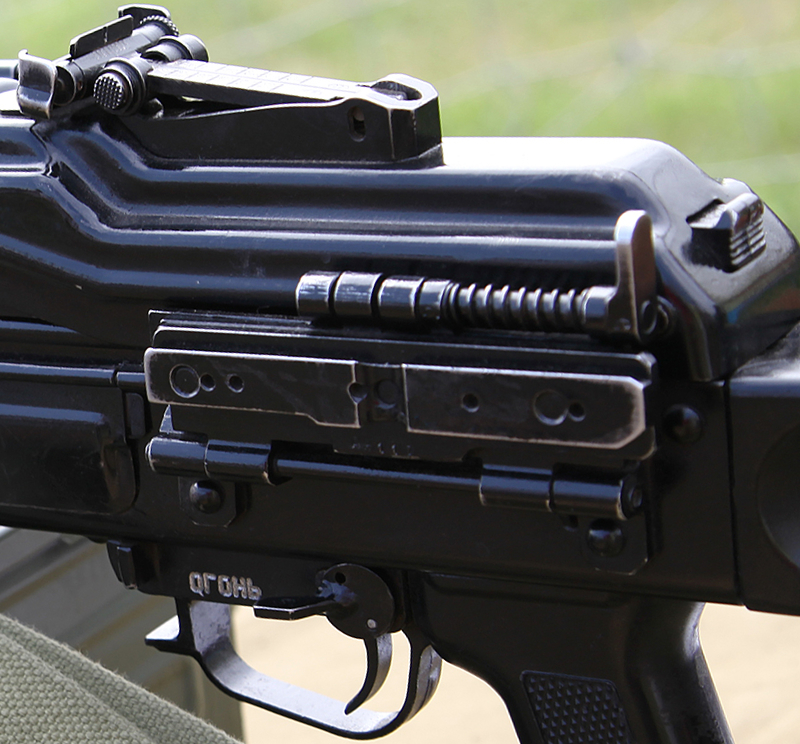
Side mounting rail on a PKP Pecheneg machine gun.

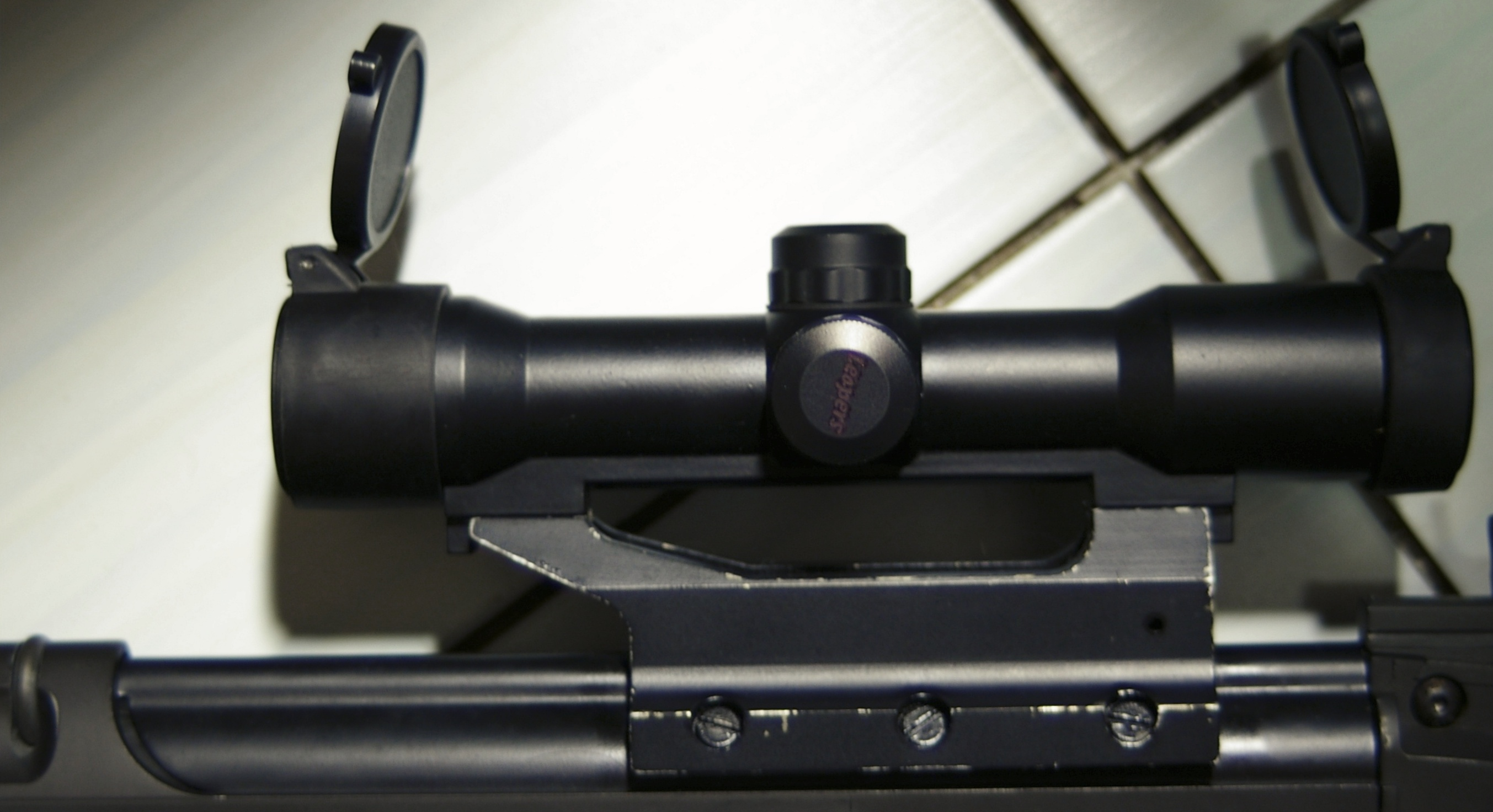
"STANAG" claw mount (receiver interface) on an FN FAL. This type of mount has also been used on several previous models by Heckler & Koch, such as for example MP5 and G3.

==== Mounting rails ====
Drawing of Zeiss rail compatible telescopic sight and mount (left) and a traditional ring mount (right). Both feature a picatinny rail receiver interface.

European telescopic sight manufacturers often offer the option to have mounting rails underneath the sight to provide for mounting solutions that do not use scope rings or a single scope ring around the objective of the sight. These rails are an integral part of the telescopic sight body and can not be removed. The mounting rail permits the telescopic sight to be securely and tension-free mounted at the preferred height and correct distance from the shooter's eye and on different guns.

There are several mounting rail systems offered:

- Standard prism, also known as the LM rail or 70° prism rail
- Zeiss rail, also used by Docter, Leica, Minox, Steiner-Optik and Meopta. Since 2016 also offered by Schmidt & Bender under the name LMZ (Light Metal with Z-rail) on some of their hunting telescopic sights.
- Swarovski Rail (SR), also used by Kahles (a subsidiary of Swarovski)
- Schmidt & Bender Convex, also marketed under the name LMC (Light Metal with Convex rail).

The traditional standard prism mounting rail system requires to have the mounting rail drilled from the side for fixture screws. The more recent proprietary systems mainly offer aesthetic advantages for people who have problems with redundant drill holes in the sight in case it is used on different guns. To avoid drilling the mounting rail, the proprietary rail mounting systems have special shape connections machined in the inside of the rail. These shape connections prevent ever showing any exterior damage from mounting work on the sight. The proprietary rail systems use matching slide-in mount fasteners to connect the telescopic sight to the gun. Some proprietary rails also offer the possibility to tilt the sight up to 1° (60 moa; 17.5 mrad) to the left or right.

Technical advantages of rail mounting systems are the reliability and robustness of such mounting solutions. Even under hard recoil there will be no play in mounts and tolerances will not change over time and hard use. The additional material due to rail on the underside of the sight's construction also adds stiffness and robustness to the sight's body.

==== Rail interface systems ====
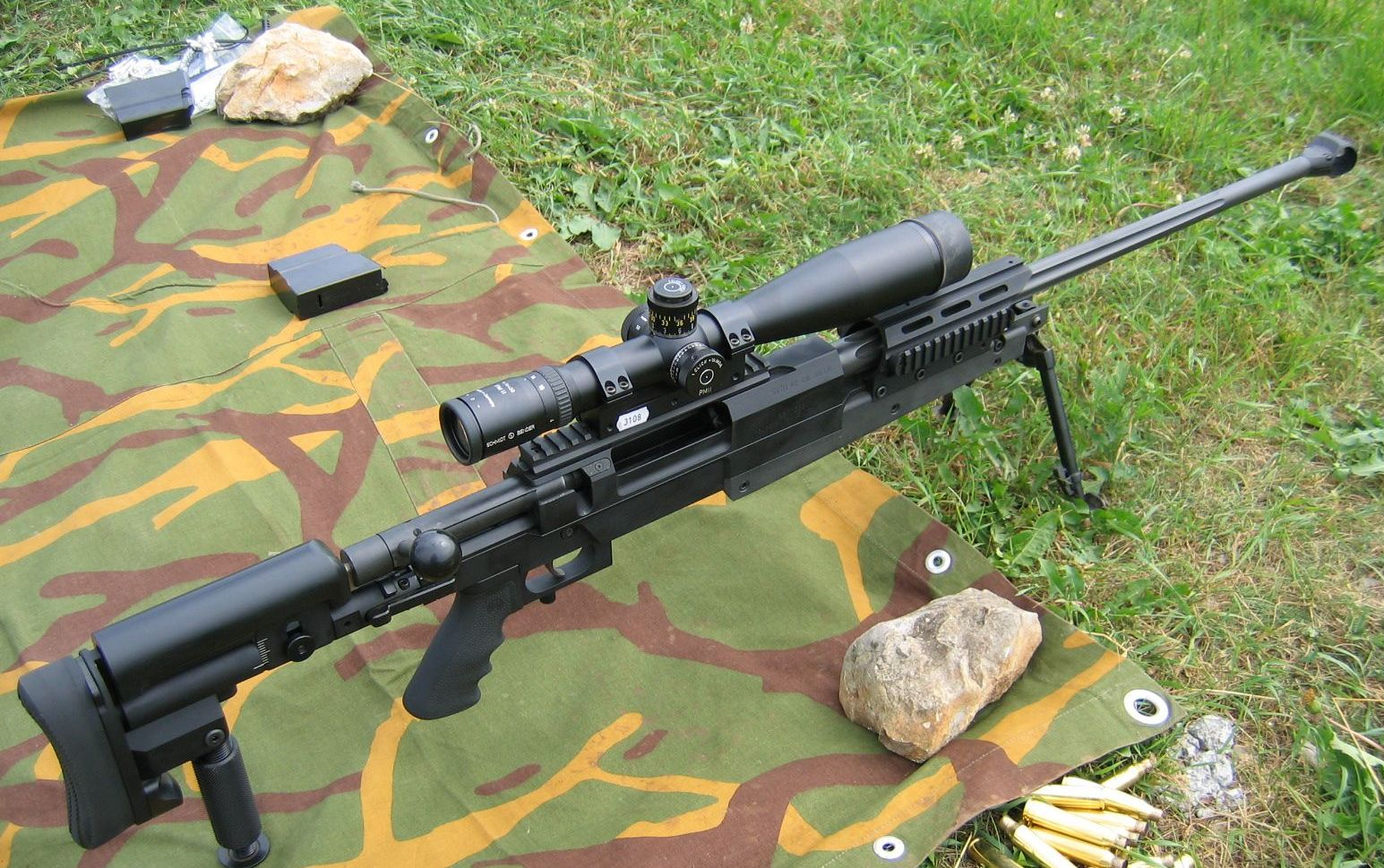
Telescopic sight fitted with scope rings on a Picatinny/MIL-STD-1913 rail mounted above the receiver of a sniper rifle.

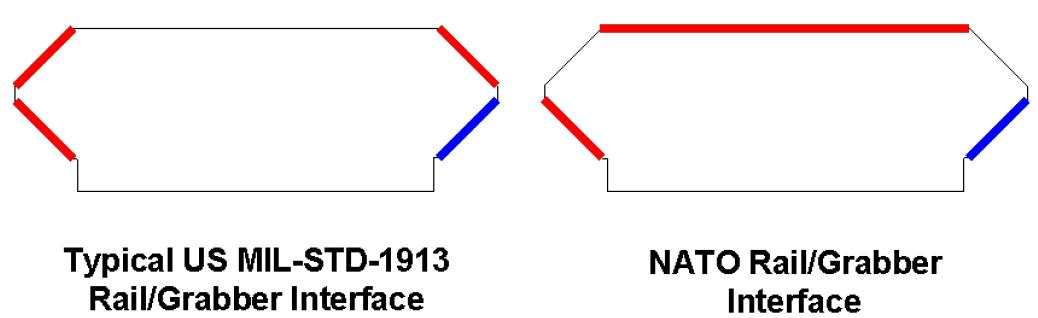
Design difference in grabber interfaces between the Picatinny rail and the new NATO Accessory Rail.

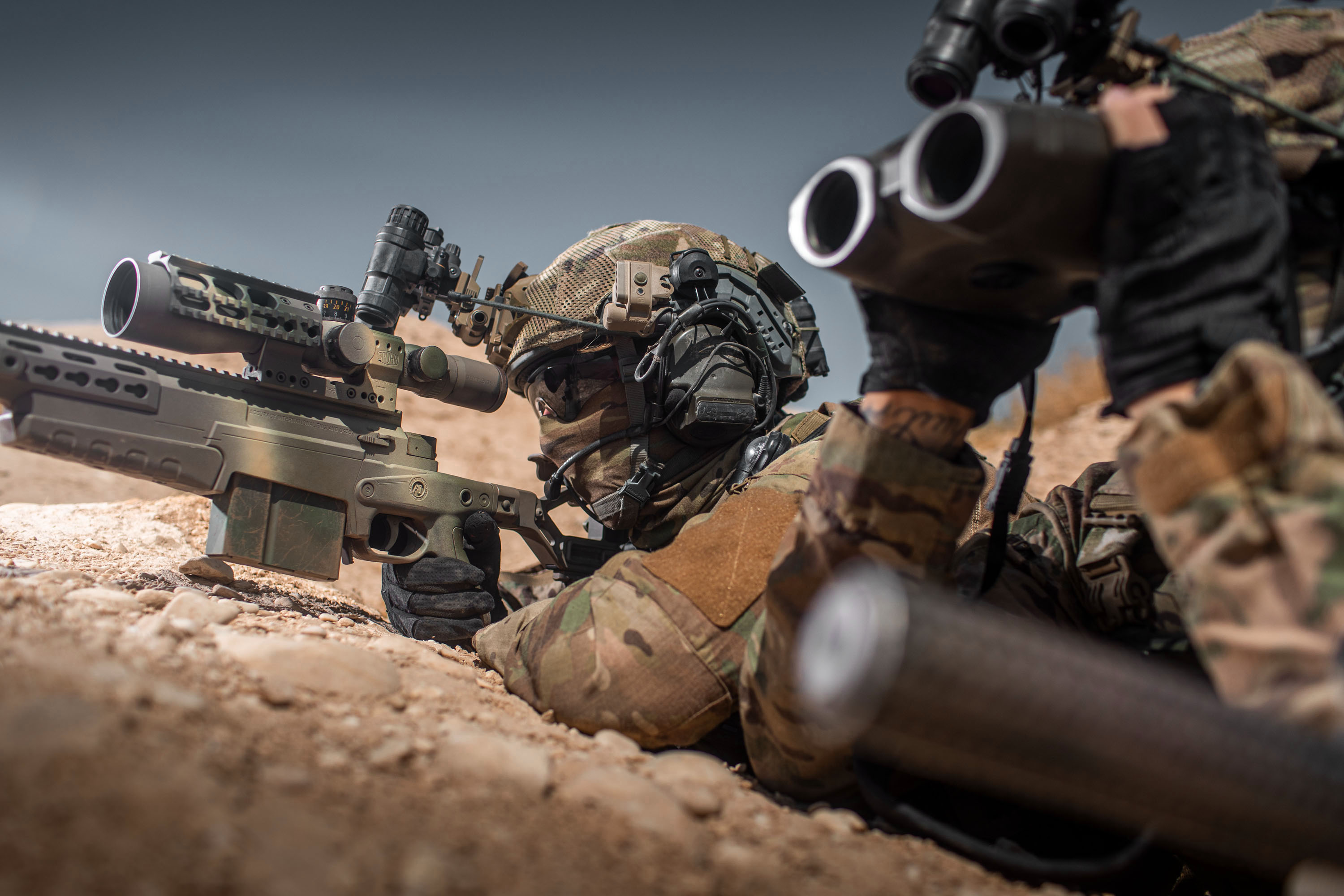
The scope mount itself can be used as the interface for attaching other accessories.

For mounting telescopic sights and/or other accessories to guns several rail interface systems are available to provide a standardized mounting platform.

The best known rail interface system is the standardized MIL-STD-1913 Picatinny rail or "Pic rail", also known as the STANAG 2324 rail after its adoption by NATO forces on 3 February 1995. It is named after the Picatinny Arsenal in New Jersey, where it was originally designed, tested and proposed for military adoption over other rail standards at the time. The Picatinny rail comprises a T-rail whose top portion has a flattened hexagonal cross-section, interspersed with evenly spaced transverse "spacing slots" to accommodate long horizontal screws. Telescopic sight mounting rings are mounted either by sliding them on from one end or the other; by means of a "rail-grabber" which is clamped to the rail with bolts, thumbscrews or levers; or onto the slots between the raised sections.

Another older, commercially available rail system is the Weaver rail, which was designed and popularized in the 1950s by William R. Weaver (1905–1975), and was the non-standardized conceptual precursor of the Picatinny rail. The main differences between the Picatinny rail and the Weaver rail are the rail dimensions and the spacing of the cross-slots, although the Picatinny rail is backward-compatible with almost all Weaver accessories (but not vice versa).

The NATO Accessory Rail (NAR), defined by the new STANAG 4694, was approved by NATO on 8 May 2009 to replace the Picatinny rail as the standard rail interface system for mounting auxiliary equipment such as telescopic sights, tactical lights, laser aiming modules, night vision devices, reflex sights, foregrips, bipods, and bayonets to small arms such as rifles and pistols. The NATO Accessory Rail is a metric upgrade of the Picatinny rail with redesigned grabber surfaces but almost identical profile and dimensions, and the two rail systems are essentially cross-compatible.

=== Mounting issues ===
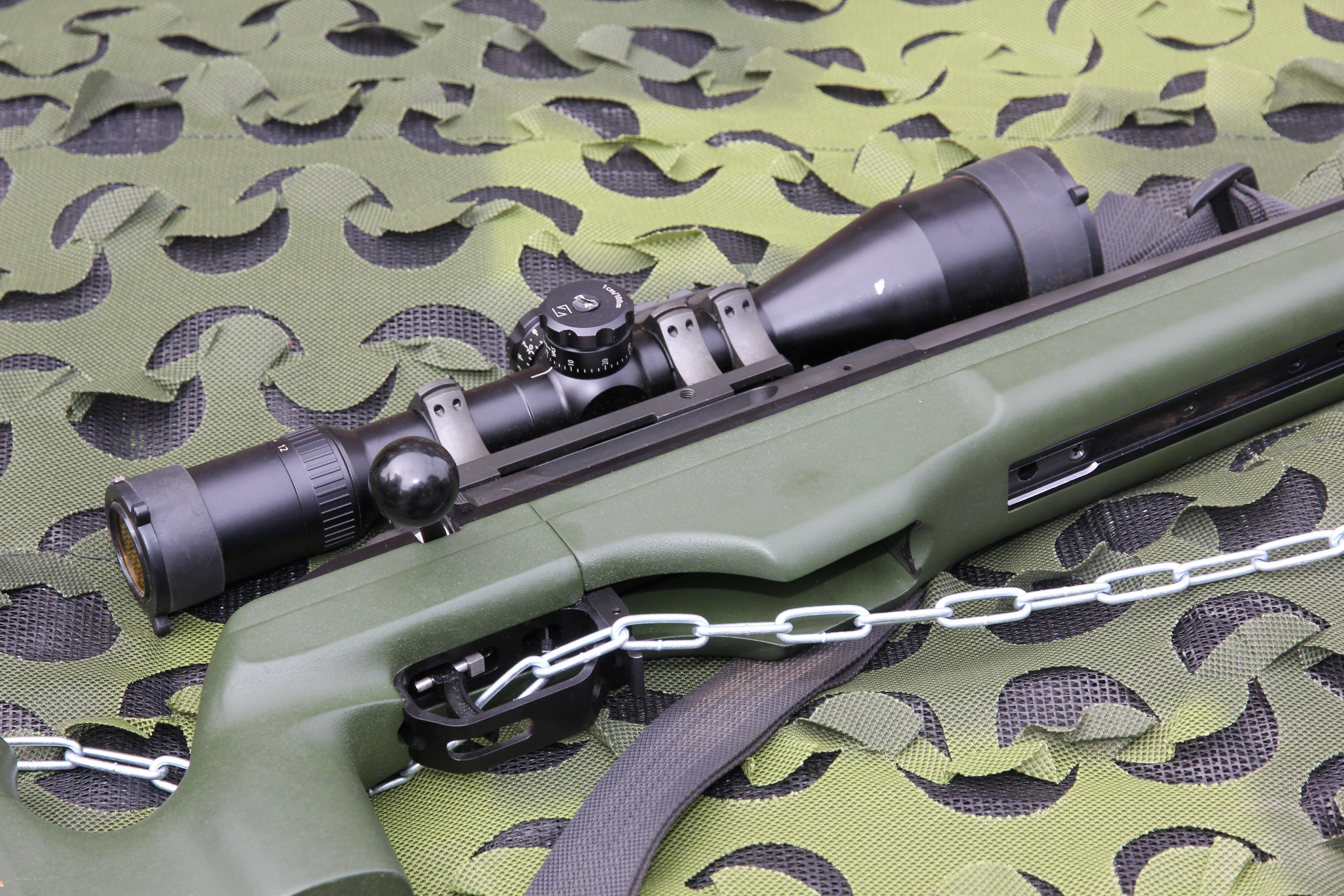
A telescopic sight mounting set featuring three rings on a heavy-recoiling .338 Lapua Magnum chambered TRG-42 sniper rifle

Telescopic sights for use on light-recoiling firearms, such as rimfire guns, can be mounted with a single ring, and this method is not uncommon on handguns, where space is at a premium. Most telescopic sights are mounted with two rings, one in the front half of the telescopic sight and one on the back half, which provides additional strength and support. The heaviest-recoiling firearms, such as Thompson Center Arms Contender pistols in heavy-recoiling calibers, will use three rings for maximum support of the telescopic sight. Use of too few rings can result not only in the telescopic sight moving under recoil, but also excessive torque on the telescopic sight tube as the gun rolls up under recoil.

Telescopic sights on heavy-recoiling firearms and spring piston airguns (which have a heavy "reverse recoil" caused by the piston reaching the end of its travel) suffer from a condition called scope creep, where the inertia of the telescopic sight holds it still as the firearm recoils under it. Because of this, scope rings must be precisely fitted to the telescopic sight, and tightened very consistently to provide maximum hold without putting uneven stress on the body of the telescopic sight. Rings that are out of round, misaligned in the bases, or tightened unevenly can warp or crush the body of the telescopic sight.

Another problem is mounting a telescopic sight on a rifle where the shell is ejected out the top of the action, such as some lever action designs. Usually this results in the telescopic sight being offset to one side (to the left for right-handed people, right for left-handed) to allow the shell to clear the telescopic sight. Alternately a scout rifle-type mount can be used, which places a long-eye-relief telescopic sight forward of the action.

A firearm may not always be able to fit all aiming optics solutions, so it is wise to have a preferred aiming optics solution first reviewed by a professional.

=== Adjustable mounts ===
Some modern mounts also allow for adjustment, but it is generally intended to supplement the telescopic sight's own internal adjustments in the case of needing unusually large elevation adjustments. For example, some situations require fairly extreme elevation adjustments, such as very short range shooting common with airguns, or very long-range shooting, where the bullet drop becomes very significant and thus requires more elevation compensation than the sight internal adjustment mechanism can provide. Loose manufacturing tolerances may result in base mounting holes being less than perfectly aligned with the bore.

In this case, rather than adjusting the telescopic sight to the extremes of its elevation adjustment, the telescopic sight mount can be adjusted. This allows the telescopic sight to operate near the center of its adjustment range, which puts less stress on the internal components. Some companies offer adjustable bases, while others offer tapered bases with a given amount of elevation built in (commonly listed in MOA). The adjustable bases are more flexible, but the fixed bases are far more durable, as adjustable bases may loosen and shift under recoil and can be susceptible to dirt ingress. Adjustable bases are considerably more expensive.

== Uses ==
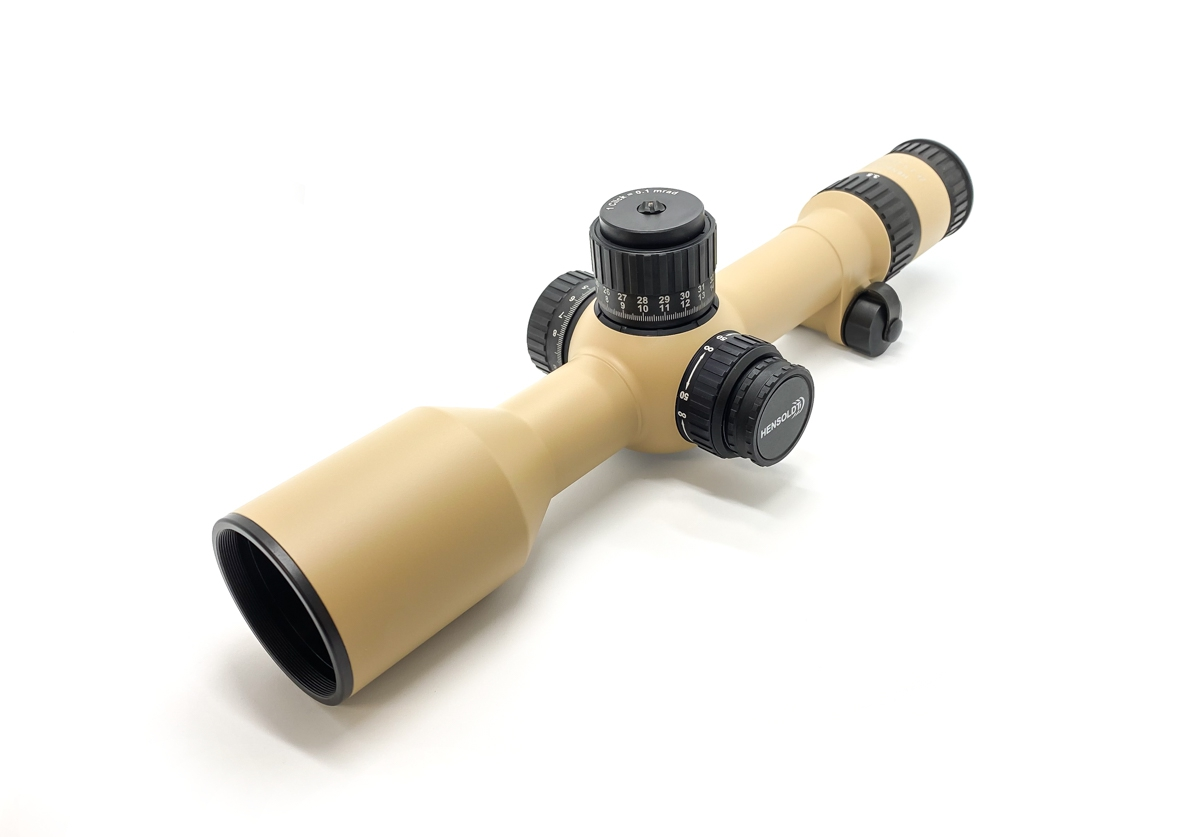
Hensoldt 3,5-26x56 with tan surface finish. Due to the zoom ratio, it can be used for both short and long range.

Telescopic sights have both advantages and disadvantages relative to iron sights. Standard doctrine with iron sights is to focus the eye on the front sight and align it with the resulting blur of the target and the rear sight; most shooters have difficulty doing this, as the eye tends to be drawn to the target, blurring both sights. Gun users over 30 years of age with keen eyesight will find it harder to keep the target, front sight element and rear sight element in focus well enough for aiming purposes, as human eyes gradually lose focusing flexibility with rising age, due to presbyopia.

Telescopic sights allow the user to focus on both the crosshair and the target at the same time, as the lenses project the crosshair into the distance (50 meters or yards for rimfire sights, 100 meters or yards more for centerfire calibers). This, combined with telescopic magnification, clarifies the target and makes it stand out against the background. The main disadvantage of magnification is that the area to either side of the target is obscured by the tube of the sight. The higher the magnification, the narrower the field of view in the sight, and the more area is hidden.

Rapid fire target shooters use reflex sights, which have no magnification. This gives them the best field of view while maintaining the single focal plane of a telescopic sight. Telescopic sights are expensive and require additional training to align. Sight alignment with telescopic sights is a matter of making the field of vision circular to minimize parallax error. For maximum effective light-gathering and brightest image, the exit pupil should equal the diameter of the fully dilated iris of the human eye—about 7 mm, reducing with age.

=== Military ===
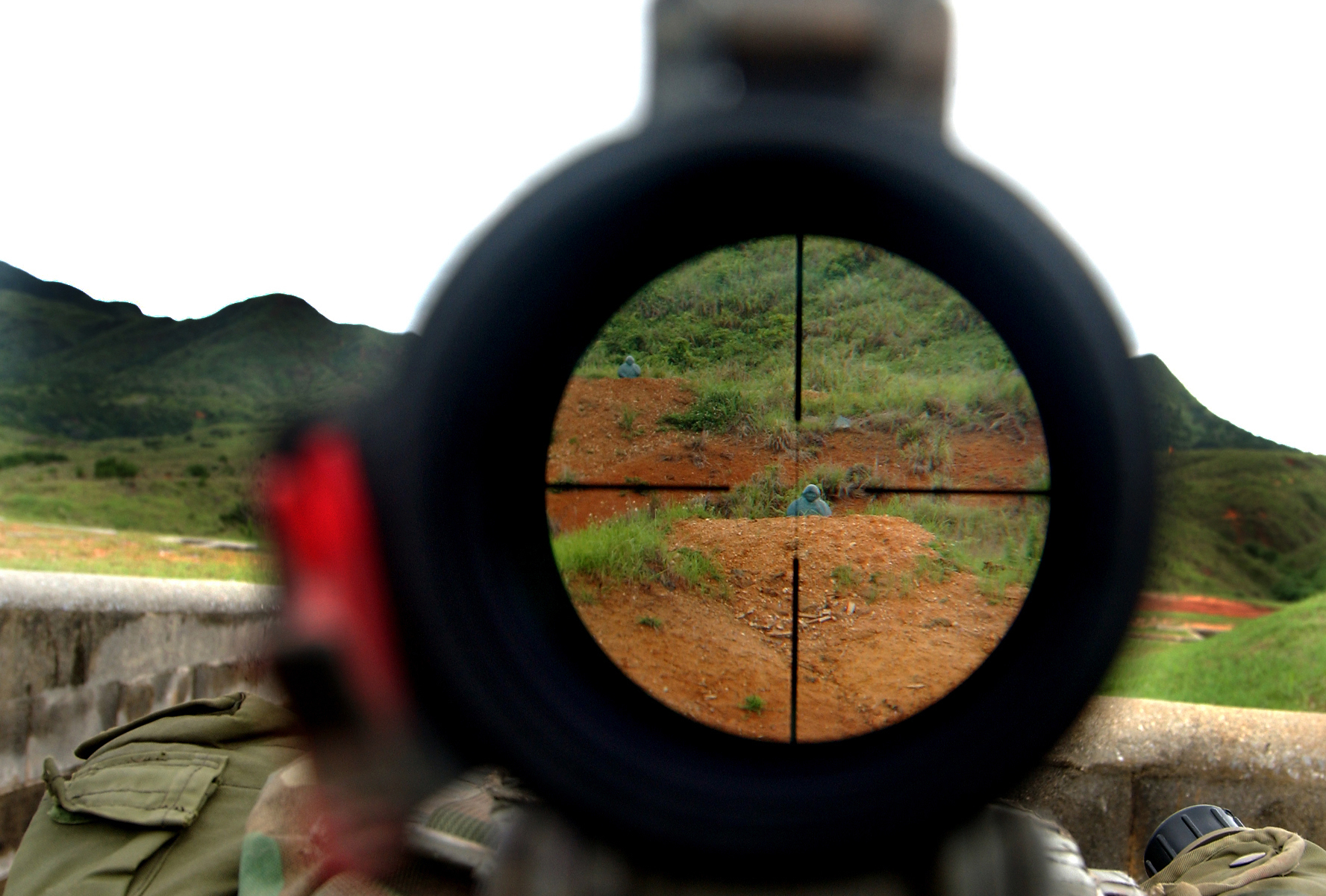
Looking through a USMC sniper rifle's sight

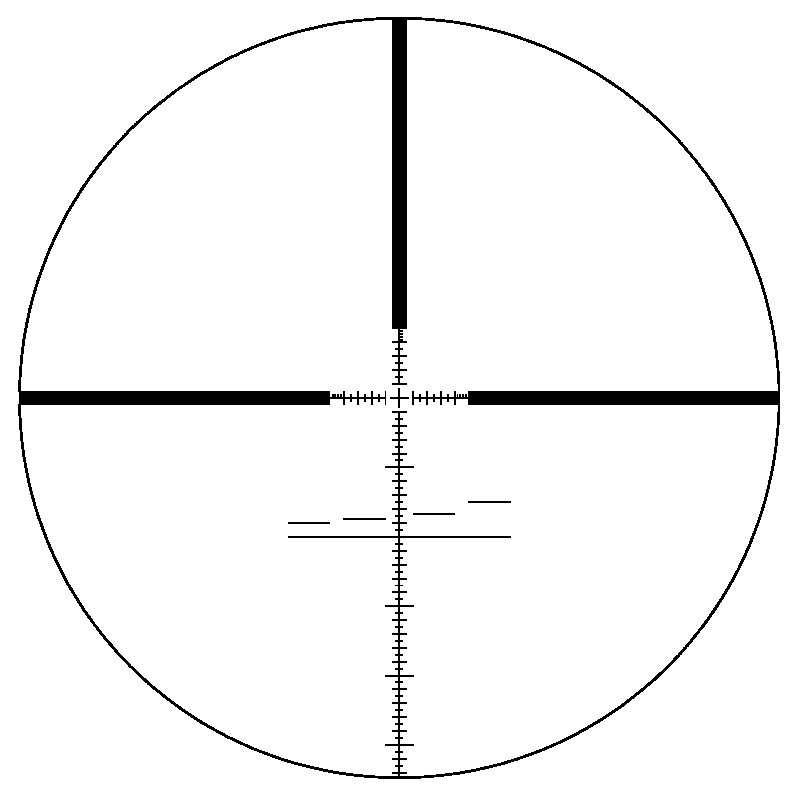
seen at 5× zoom

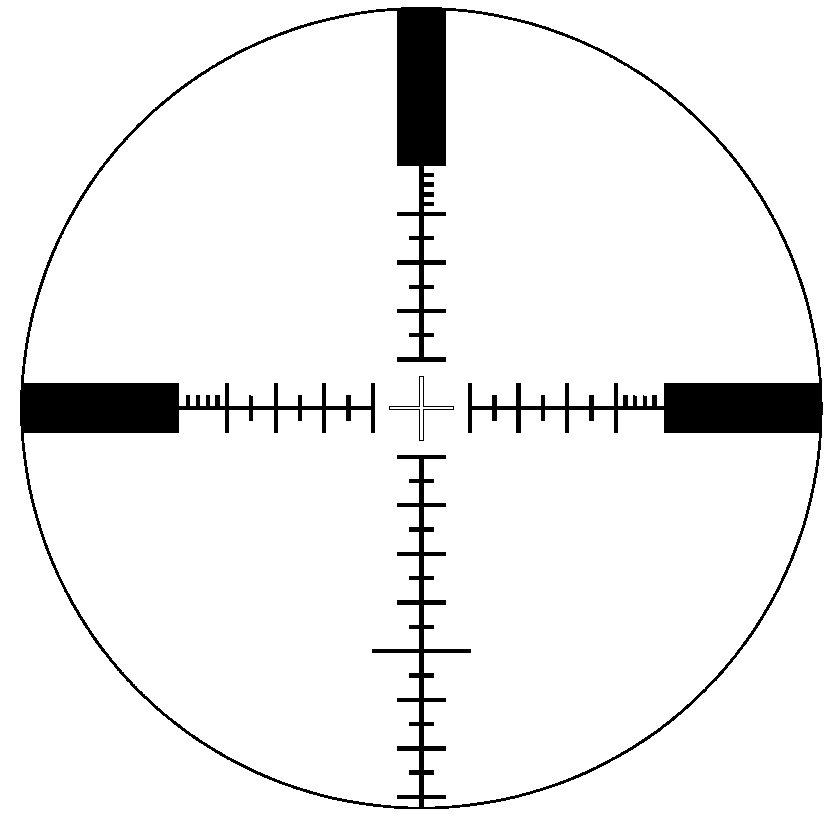
seen at 25× zoom

The P4 stadiametric rangefinding reticle as used in the Schmidt & Bender 5–25×56 PM II LP telescopic sight.

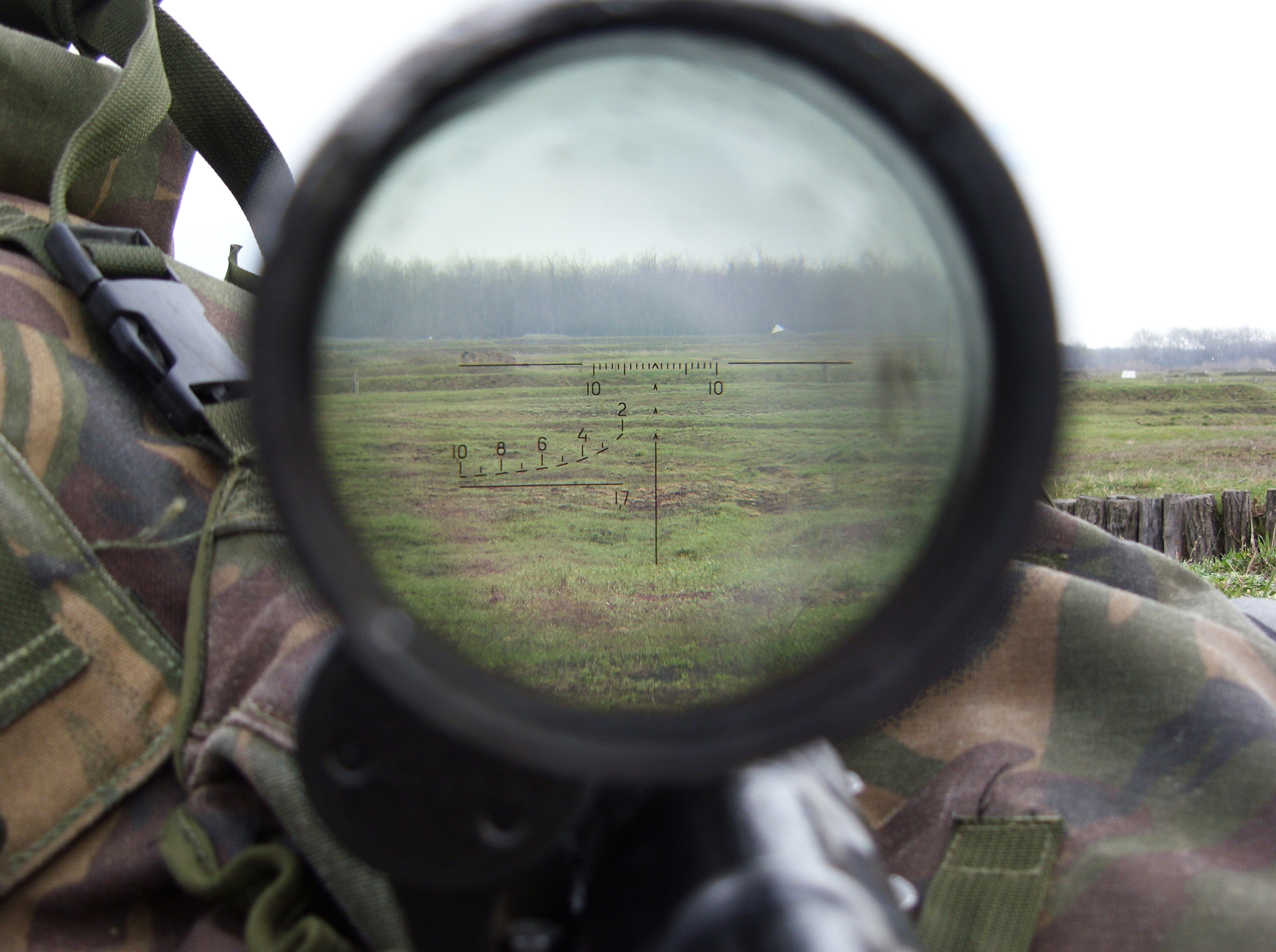
PSO-1 reticle, the bottom-left corner can be used to determine the distance from a 170-cm-tall target (expected average height of an enemy combatant).

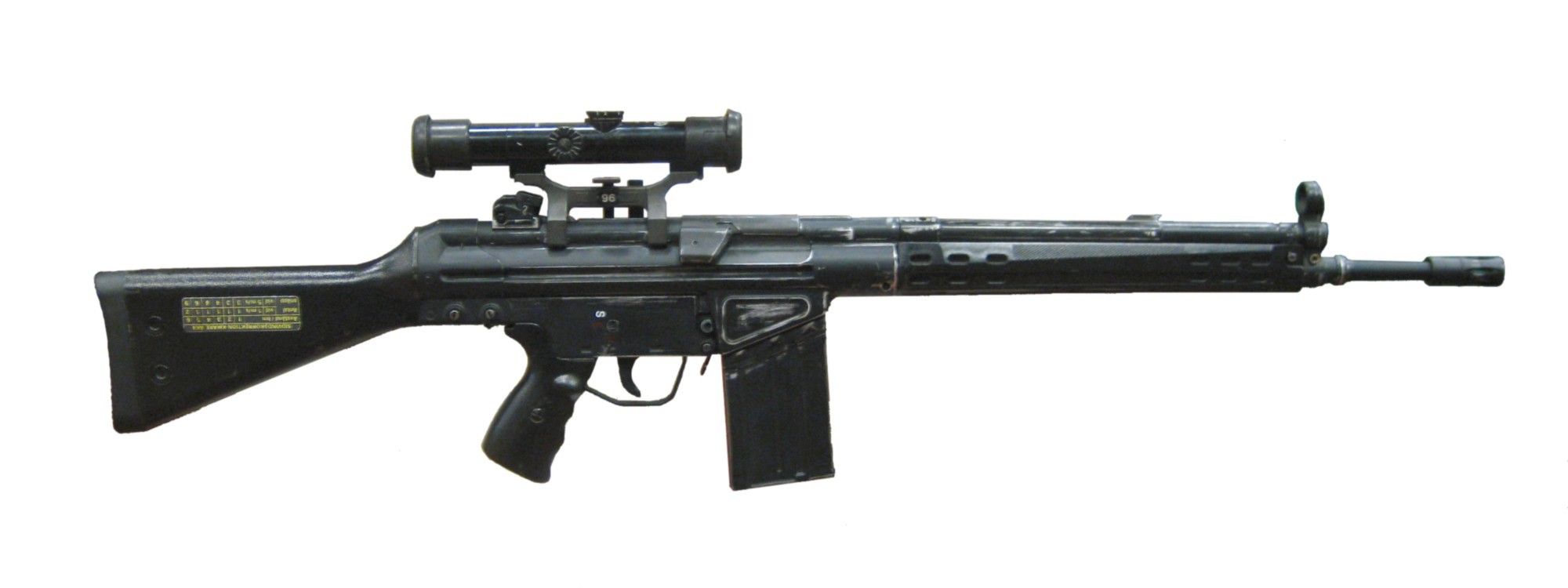
Swedish Ak4OR (H&K G3 variant) with Hensoldt 4×24 M1 telescopic sight.

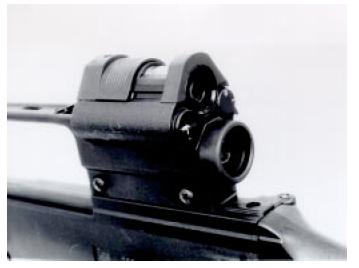
Dual combat sighting system: ZF 3×4° optical sight topped with red dot sight as used on German G36A1 assault/sniper rifles.

Though they had been used as early as the mid-19th century on rifled muskets, and even earlier for other tasks, it wasn't until the 1980s when optical devices for service rifles, such as the Austrian Steyr AUG and the British SUSAT mounted on the SA80, became standard issue, military usage of telescopic sights were mostly restricted to designated marksman and snipers because of the fragility and expense of optical components. The glass lenses are prone to breakage, and environmental conditions such as condensation, precipitation, dirt, and mud obscure external lenses. The sight's tube adds significant bulk and weight to the rifle. Snipers generally used moderate to high magnification sights with special reticles that allow them to estimate range to the target. Since the 1990s, many other armed forces have adopted optical devices for general use to infantry units, as the rate of adoption has increased, as the cost of manufacturing has decreased over the years.

Telescopic sights provide some tactical disadvantages. Snipers rely on stealth and concealment to get close to their target. A telescopic sight can hinder this because sunlight may reflect from the lens and a sniper raising his head to use a telescopic sight might reveal his position. The famous Finnish sniper Simo Häyhä preferred to use iron sights rather than telescopic sights to present less of a target. Harsh climate can also cause problems for telescopic sights as they are less rugged than iron sights. Many Finnish snipers in World War II used iron sights heavily because telescopic sights did not cope with very cold Finnish winters.

The market for military telescopic sights intended for military long-range shooting is highly competitive. Several high end optics manufacturers are constantly adapting and improving their telescopic sights to fulfill specific demands of military organizations. Two European companies that are active this field are Schmidt & Bender and Zeiss/Hensoldt. American companies that are also very active in this field are Nightforce, U.S. Optics Inc. and Leupold. These high-end sighting components generally cost €1500 / $2000 or more. Typical options for military telescopic sights are reticle illumination for use under adverse light circumstances and the presentation of sight settings or ballistic relevant environmental measurements data to the operator through the sights ocular.

The former Warsaw Pact members produce military telescopic sights for their designated marksmen and developed a range finding reticle based on the height of an average human. This stadiametric rangefinder reticle was originally used in the Russian PSO-1 4×24 telescopic sight and is calibrated for ranging a 1.7-m-tall target from 200 m to 1000 m. The target base has to be lined up on the horizontal line of the range-finding scale and the target top point has to touch the upper (dotted) line of the scale without clearance. The digit under which this line up occurs determines the distance to the target. The PSO-1 basic design and stadiametric rangefinder are also found in the POSP and other telescopic sight models.

The Israeli military began widespread use of telescopic sights by ordinary infantrymen to increase hit probability (especially in dim light) and extend effective range of standard issue infantry rifles. Palestinian militants in the al Aqsa Intifada likewise found that adding an inexpensive telescopic sight to an AK-47 increased its effectiveness.

Today, several militaries issue telescopic sights to their infantry, usually compact, low-magnification sights suitable for snap-shooting. The U.S. military issues the Advanced Combat Optical Gunsight (ACOG), designed to be used on the M16 rifle and M4 carbine. American soldiers in Iraq and Afghanistan frequently purchase their own combat optics and carry them from home. The British army fields the SA80 rifle with the SUSAT 4× optical sight as standard issue. The Canadian Forces standard C7 rifle has a 3.4× Elcan C79 optical sight. Both Austria and Australia field variants of the Austrian Steyr AUG which has built an integral 1.5× optical sight since its deployment in the late 1970s.

The German Army G36 assault rifles have a more or less built in dual combat sighting system consisting of a ZF 3×4° telescopic sight combined with an unmagnified electronic red dot sight. The dual combat sighting system weighs 30 g (1.1 oz) due to a housing made out of glass fiber reinforced polyamide. All German G36 rifles are adapted to use the Hensoldt NSA 80 II third-generation night sight, which clamps into the G36 carry handle adapter in front of the optical sight housing and mates with the rifle's standard dual-combat sighting system.

== See also ==
- Cardinal point (optics)
- Picatinny rail
