= Swarovski (surname) =

Swarovski, Svárovský and variations are Czech surnames.

Notable people with the name include:

- Daniel Swarovski (1862–1956), Czech-Austrian businessman and co-founder of Austrian glass producer Swarovski
- Evelyn Haim-Swarovski (born 1954), Austrian dressage rider
- Fiona Swarovski (born 1965), Australian-Italian-Swiss entrepreneur, fashion designer and personal stylist
- Fyodor Svarovsky (born 1971), Russian poet and journalist
- Gernot Langes-Swarovski (1943–2021), Austrian businessman, relative of Daniel
- Hans Swarowsky (1899–1975), Hungarian-Austrian conductor
- Leoš Svárovský (born 1961), Czech conductor
- Markus Langes-Swarovski (born 1974), an Austrian businessman, relative of Daniel
- Manfred Swarovski, Austrian businessman, relative of Daniel, see Swarco Holding
- Nadja Swarovski (born 1970), Austrian-American businesswoman
- Victoria Swarovski (born 1993), Austrian pop singer

== See also ==
- Svárov (disambiguation)
- Swarovski (disambiguation)
