= Swarovski (disambiguation) =

Swarovski may refer to:

- Swarovski AG, manufacturer of cut lead glass
  - Swarovski Optik, a subsidiary
- Swarovski (surname), includes a list of people with the name
- FC Swarovski Tirol, an Austrian football club (1986–1992)

== See also ==
- Svárovský
