= British Independent Film Awards =

British film award

- Current: British Independent Film Awards 2026
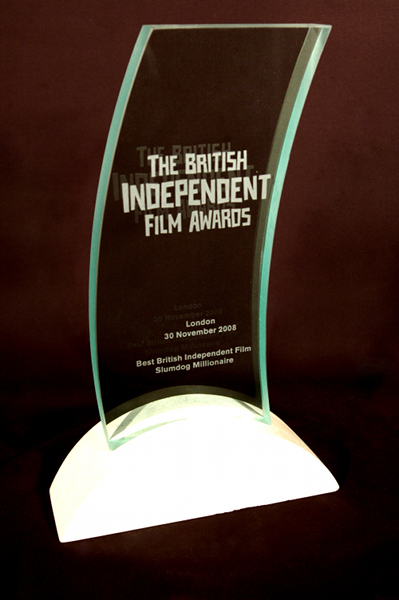
- Awarded for: Achievement in independently funded British film
- Country: United Kingdom
- First award: 1998
- Website: bifa.film

The British Independent Film Awards (BIFA) is an organisation that celebrates, supports, and promotes British independent cinema and film-making talent in the United Kingdom. Nominations for the annual awards ceremony are announced in early November, with the ceremony itself taking place in early December.

Since 2015, BIFA has also hosted UK-wide talent development and film screening programmes, with the support of Creative Skillset and the British Film Institute.

== History ==
The British Independent Film Awards (BIFA) were created in 1998 by Elliot Grove and Suzanne Ballantyne of the Raindance Film Festival, with the aim of celebrating merit and achievement in independently funded British filmmaking, honouring new talent and promoting British films and filmmaking to a wider public audience. BIFA founding members include Phillip Alberstat, Chris Auty, André Burgess, Sally Caplan, Pippa Cross, Christopher Fowler, Lora Fox Gamble, Steven Gaydos, Norma Heyman, Emma E. Hickox, Fred Hogge, Robert Jones, Steve Kenis, Alberto Lopez, Ollie Madden, Hamish McAlpine, Neil McCartney, Saul Metzstein, Martin Myers, Sarah Radclyffe, Tracey Scoffield, Mark Shivas, Jim Wilson, and Michiyo Yoshizaki.

The first BIFA ceremony took place on 29 October 1998. Winners included Ken Loach (for My Name is Joe), Shane Meadows (for Twentyfour Seven) and Ray Winstone (for Nil by Mouth). The Special Jury Prize was awarded to Nik Powell, and the Best British Independent Film award went to My Name is Joe.

== Ceremony ==
The BIFA ceremony takes place in early December every year and is one of the first dates in the annual awards season. Most of the awards categories are for British independent feature films only, though there are awards for Best International Independent Film and Best British Short Film. There are also several honorary awards, such as the Special Jury Prize, the Richard Harris Award and the Variety Award. Awarded since 2013, the trophy has been a sculpture by Fredrikson Stallard for Swarovski.

== Award categories ==
=== Current categories ===
- Best British Independent Film
- Best Director
- Best Screenplay
- Best Lead Performance
- Best Supporting Performance
- Best Joint Lead Performance
- Best Ensemble Performance
- Breakthrough Performance
- Best Documentary
- Best British Short Film
- Best International Independent Film
- Best Casting
- Best Cinematography
- Best Costume Design
- Best Editing
- Best Effects
- Best Make-Up & Hair Design
- Best Original Music
- Best Music Supervision
- Best Production Design
- Best Sound
- The Douglas Hickox Award (Best Debut Director)
- Best Debut Director – Feature Documentary
- Best Debut Screenwriter
- Breakthrough Producer
- The Raindance Maverick Award
- The Richard Harris Award (hon)
- The Variety Award (hon)
- The Special Jury Prize (hon)

=== Discontinued categories ===
- Achievement in Production (1998–2014)
- Producer of the Year (1999–2002, 2015)
- Best Technical Achievement (2001–2016)
- Best Actor (1998–2021)
- Best Actress (1998–2021)
- Best Supporting Actor (2008–2021)
- Best Supporting Actress (2008–2021)

== Entry criteria ==
BIFA entries close in late August / early September.

Main categories (British feature films):

- Films must be over 70 minutes in length.
- Films must have had a public screening to a paying audience, either on general release in the UK or at a British film festival or at one of BIFA's recognised international festivals.
- Must be produced or majority co-produced by a British production company, or be in receipt of at least 51% of its budget from British source(s) and have sufficient British creative elements (e.g. Director, Writer, Producer, other cast & crew).
- Where there is a major studio substantially funding a film, the total budget must not exceed $20 million.

Best International Independent Film:

- Films must have had a theatrical release in the UK within BIFA's eligibility dates for the given year, or have won an award at one of BIFA's recognised international film festivals.

== Voting process ==
BIFA has a large pool of voters that consists of past BIFA winners and nominees, top British film industry professionals and experienced filmmakers from all areas of production. Although the pool is continually growing, fewer than 200 voters vote for the nominations in any one year.

All entered films must be seen by a minimum number of voters and discussed at a voter meeting before being marked as having been given fair consideration. Once all entered films have been given fair consideration, votes are cast privately in two rounds: once to reduce all entries to long lists of around 15 films in each category, and again to reduce the long lists to the 5 final nominees. In calculating the results, BIFA takes into account the number of voters who have seen each film as well as how many voted for it.

The winners in most categories are decided by independent juries, newly–appointed each year. Juries meet to discuss all nominations before voting confidentially for the winner. Exceptions include the honorary awards and the award for Best British Independent Film, the winner of which is decided by a confidential vote amongst all BIFA voters.

== Year-round activity ==
Since 2015, BIFA has also hosted UK–wide talent development and film screening programmes with the support of Creative Skillset and the BFI.

== BIFA Insider ==
Running from September 2015 to June 2016, BIFA Insider gave UK–based university and film school students the chance to watch award-winning British films for free online and participate in live-streamed Q&As with top craftspeople who worked on those films.

Sessions included The Lobster with production designer Jaqueline Abrahams, The Selfish Giant with casting director Amy Hubbard and Frank with composer Stephen Rennicks.

== BIFA Presents ==
BIFA Presents is an ongoing project wherein BIFA supports the theatrical distribution of award-nominated and -winning films with special preview and event screenings. In February 2017, BIFA Presents hosted exclusive previews of the Oscar-winning Moonlight in conjunction with Everyman Cinemas.

== BIFA Independents ==
BIFA Independents is a series of regular screenings of films featuring BIFA-winning and nominated talent. Supported by the BFI, Odeon Cinemas, Vue Cinemas and Everyman Cinemas, the screenings take place in 20 UK locations and aim to increase the number of people who watch British independent films at the cinema.

The first BIFA Independents screening was in December 2016, featuring Andrea Arnold's Best British Independent Film-winning American Honey.

== Patrons ==
BIFA Patrons include:

- Mike Figgis
- Tom Hollander
- Adrian Lester
- Ken Loach
- Ewan McGregor
- Helen Mirren
- Samantha Morton
- James Nesbitt
- Michael Sheen
- Trudie Styler
- Tilda Swinton
- Meera Syal
- David Thewlis
- Ray Winstone
- Michael Winterbottom
