= Tyrolit =

Austrian manufacturer of abrasives

Tyrolit AG
- Company type: Aktiengesellschaft
- Industry: Abrasives
- Founded: February 13, 1919; 107 years ago
- Founder: Daniel Swarovski (co-founder)
- Headquarters: Schwaz, Austria
- Key people: Thomas Friess, Peter Dollinger, Matthias Kuprian, Andreas Sauerwein
- Products: Conventional and superabrasive grinding wheels, cut-off wheels, diamond tools for the construction and stone industries, concrete sawing and drilling machinery, coated abrasives
- Revenue: ca. €720 million (2024)
- Number of employees: 4,000+ worldwide (2024)
- Website: tyrolit.group

Tyrolit is an Austrian company headquartered in Schwaz that develops, manufactures and markets abrasive products as well as concrete sawing and drilling equipment. With more than 30 production sites on five continents and activities in over 140 countries, the Tyrolit Group is one of the major international manufacturers of bonded abrasives. Tyrolit is a registered trademark. It is named after the mineral Tyrolite (copper foam), first described in 1817 in Tyrol.

== History ==
=== 1919: founding ===
Tyrolit was co-founded on 13 February 1919 by Daniel Swarovski to manufacture grinding tools for the production of Swarovski crystals. During World War I, the Swarovski Group had been cut off from the supply of grinding wheels and was forced to develop and produce its own. After the war, Swarovski decided to start a separate company to develop, manufacture, and market grinding wheels: Tyrolit was founded.

=== 20th century ===
In 1950, Tyrolit was spun off from the Swarovski plant in Wattens and relocated to Schwaz. Walter Waizer became the company's first managing director; during the Nazi period he had been involved in armaments production in Tyrol. One of the largest drivers of growth of the company was the launch of the glass fibre reinforced cut-off and grinding wheel SECUR in 1952. The glass fibre reinforcement improved the safety of the tools against centrifugal breakage.

In 1967, the company launched resin-bonded diamond grinding tools after demand for diamond as an abrasive for hard metals had increased. In 1991, Tyrolit acquired both the U.S. company Diamond Products and the Swiss company Hydrostress. These acquisitions added an increased presence in the market for concrete drilling and sawing systems. Through various acquisitions of smaller companies, Tyrolit sought to position itself as a full-range supplier in the field of grinding tools in the 1990s.

=== 21st century ===
Further acquisitions took place in 2004 with the purchasing of the Czech company Carborundum Electrite, in 2009 with the purchasing of the U.S. company Radiac and in 2014 with the purchasing of the South African company Grinding Techniques as well as the trading company Nestag in Switzerland. In 2020, Bibielle, an Italian manufacturer of surface conditioning materials, was integrated into the Tyrolit Group.

Since 2022, no member of the Swarovski family serves on the executive board for the first time in the company's history. Also in 2022, the acquisition of the Turkish abrasives producer Egeli Egesan was completed. In 2023, the U.S. company Acme Holding Company was acquired, an abrasives manufacturer and supplier based in Michigan.

== Organization ==
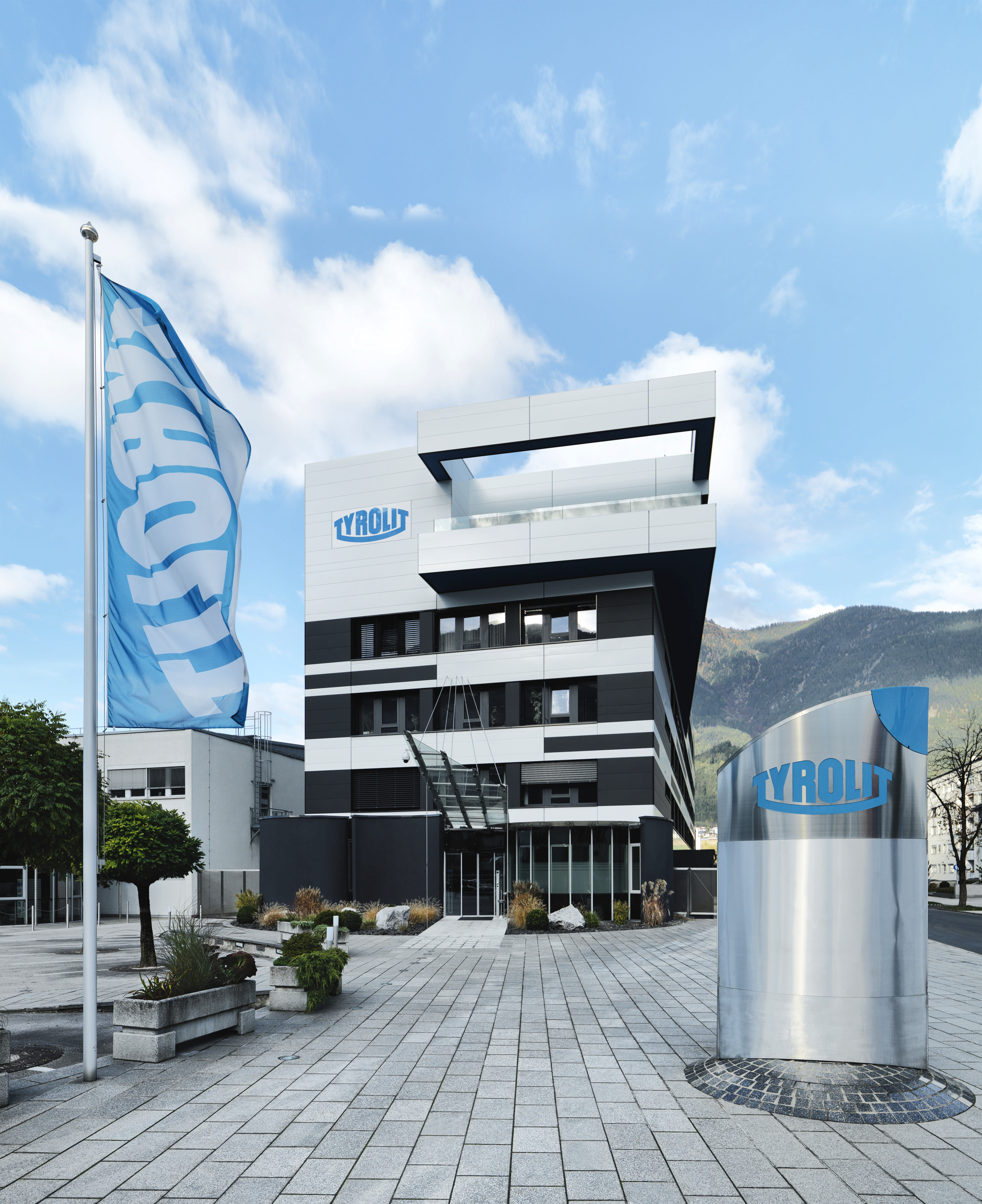
Tyrolit headquarters in Schwaz

The Tyrolit Group is organized in two divisions:

- Metal / Precision – serves the metal fabrication and precision machining markets
- Construction – serves the construction industry

== Brands ==
Tyrolit has brands across various industrial sectors, as the automotive industry or medical technology, among others. It is the largest European manufacturer of bonded grinding, cutting, sawing, and drilling tools.

The Tyrolit Group operates under the following brands:

Europe, Arab world, Africa:

- Tyrolit: global brand for all grinding processes
- Tyrolit Hydrostress: drilling and sawing equipment for the construction industry
- Tyrolit Life: abrasives for winter sports, kitchen knives, and other kitchen cutting accessories
- Carborundum Electrite: Czech producer of conventional bonded grinding wheels
- Grinding Techniques: South African producer of conventional bonded grinding wheels
- Nestag: Swiss trading company for the construction industry
- Bibielle: Italian producer of surface conditioning materials like convolute wheels and SCM belts
- Egeli Egesan: Turkish producer of conventional bonded grinding wheels and sandpaper

Americas:

- Radiac: U.S. producer of conventional bonded and superabrasive grinding wheels
- Diamond Products: U.S. producer of diamond tools and equipment for the construction industry

Asia:

- Olympus: Thai manufacturer of grinding tools for the industrial trade
- SISA: Chinese producer of ceramic abrasive grains and conventional bonded grinding wheels

== Research ==
Tyrolit is and has been active in research to design new products as well as to further develop existing ones. For example, between 1999 and 2002 the company invested around €28 million in its research division. Overall, the company holds around 500 patents. It is also a member of the Federation of European Producers of Abrasives. In 2025, Tyrolit introduced the integration platform Lino Hub, which digitally interconnects various manufacturing systems, making manual interventions unnecessary and shortening production times.

== Sponsoring ==
For several years, Tyrolit was a sponsor of the Austrian Ski Association, where members of the coaching staff and all service technicians wore caps and beanies bearing the Tyrolit logo.

== Awards ==
- 2018: Two awards at the German Design Award for products of the sub-brand Tyrolit life
- 2023: Klimaaktiv Mobil Award, an award from the Austrian Federal Ministry for Climate Action for the company’s climate-friendly mobility
