= Fredrikson Stallard =

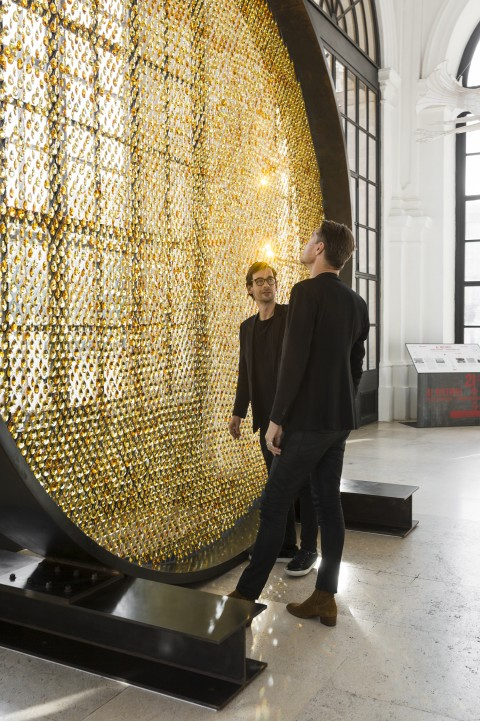
- Patrik Fredrikson and Ian Stallard standing in front of ‘Prologue’ containing over 8,000 topaz-colored Swarovski crystals at Dubai Design Week
- Born: Patrik Fredrikson & Ian Stallard; 16 August 1968 & 6 October 1973
- Education: Central St Martins
- Awards: The Red Dot Design Award (2010) and The Arts Foundation Fellowship (2006)
- Website: fredriksonstallard.com

Fredrikson Stallard is an art studio ran by Ian Stallard (born 6th of October, 1973, in Essex, United Kingdom) and Patrik Fredrikson (born 16th of August, 1968, in Malmö, Sweden). Their furniture and sculptures are recognized as examples of the British avant garde.

== Early lives ==
Ian Stallard was born in Essex, England. Patrik Fredrikson was born in Malmö, Sweden. The two met at Central St. Martins in 1995. Stallard specialized in ceramics, ” and Fredrikson in furniture. They began to exhibit their work separately at small art fairs in the United Kingdom, before they started their collaboration.

== Career ==
Table #1 (2001) and Pyrenees (2007)were acquired by the Victoria and Albert Museum in 2011 In 2005, Patrik Fredrikson and Ian Stallard officially launched their joint practice, ”Fredrikson Stallard” at the Williamsburg gallery Citizen Citizen in New York.

Their practice operates as an artist's studio, using natural and synthetic materials such as aluminium, bronze, crystal, wood, fibre-glass, and polyester to create avant-garde works that blur the line between art and design.

Their process often begins with the creation of tiny models. Created in 2011, their Crush series included a glass table with a polished metal sheet inside it and a mirror with a hollow pocket on one side. The form of their King Bonk armchairs and footstools were generated by tying upholstery foam with string before using a chainsaw to carve the final shape from polystyrene. Made from fiberglass, the chairs were available in four paint colours, which were created by Bentley.

In 2006, their work was exhibited at the Design Museum and works were acquired by the French National Art Collection.

David Gill Gallery has represented Fredrikson Stallard since 2006.

"David Gill is visionary,’ says Fredrikson ‘They have supported our dreams and ambition from the first day we started to work together – not by tying our hands as slaves to commercialism, but by opening our eyes to the immense possibilities and other dimensions achievable in the progression of our work."

Described in an interview with Wallpaper Magazine as "Kings of avant-garde design," they are perhaps best known for their vermilion-red sofas, titled Species, which were sculpted from polyurethane, glass fibre and polyester and created for their 10th Anniversary "Momentum" exhibition. The pieces were first displayed at the studio's headquarters in Holborn, London in 2015. Species is in the permanent collection of the San Francisco Museum of Modern Art.

Since 2012, their studio has been based in Holborn, London, in an 18th-century warehouse.

== Collaborations ==
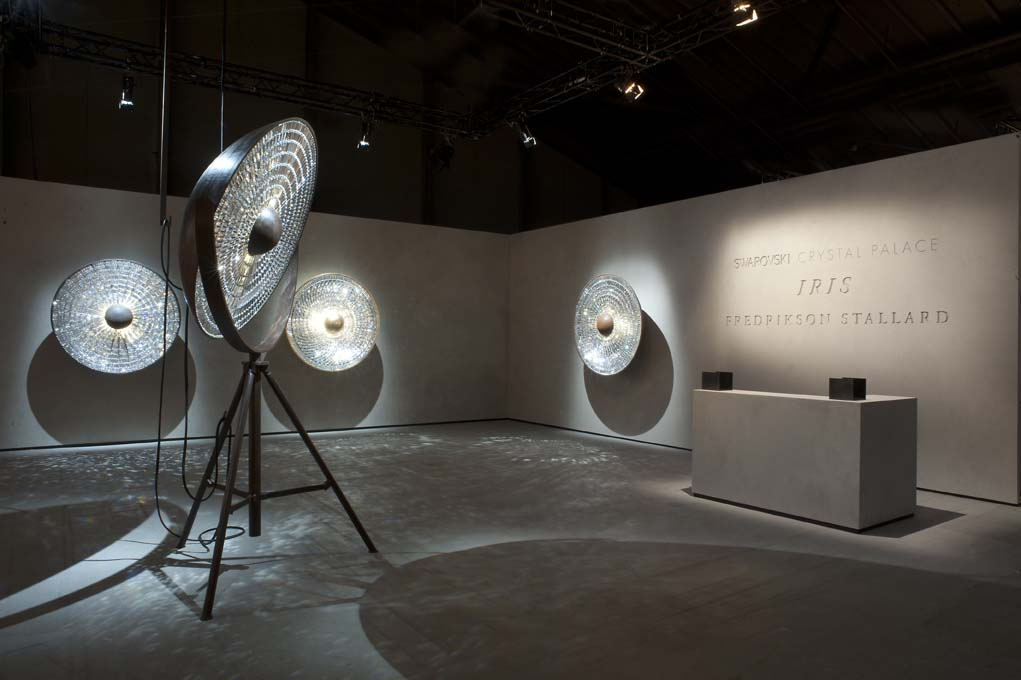
IRIS by Fredrikson Stallard for Swarovski Crystal Palace (2011)

As a global patron of design for Swarovski, Nadja Swarovski first commissioned Fredrikson Stallard in 2007 to participate in Crystal Palace, at the Salone de Mobile in Milan. The kinetic chandelier they presented, Pandora, featured 1,190 crystals on servo-controlled wires, which moved up and down to repeatedly create and then destroy the form of a traditional chandelier.

“Fredrikson Stallard are leading lights of British avant-garde design whose work with Swarovski over the years captures the spirit of adventure and experimentation…their work is always powerful, emotionally engaging and celebrates the beauty of crystal” - Nadja Swarovski

Since 2015, their Prologue sculpture, consisting of 8,000 Swarovski crystals, has been installed annually, on The British Fashion Awards red carpet. Commissioned by Swarovski, Fredrikson Stallard designed the trophy for the British Independent Film Awards BIFA.

== Exhibitions and collections ==
Their work is in the permanent collections of the San Francisco Museum of Modern Art, the Victoria and Albert Museum in London and the French National Art Collection,. Their work was exhibited at the Belvedere Museum in Vienna. They have presented group shows all around the world:

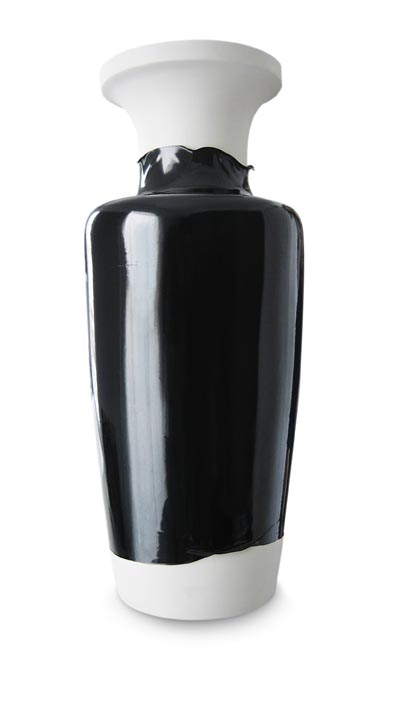
Ming#1 Vase by Fredrikson Stallard, uniting the artists together for the first time.

== Publications ==
Fredrikson Stallard's first monograph (written in part by design scholar and curator Glenn Adamson) surveying their entire career and, presenting it as a case study of 21st century design, is being published by Skira Editore in 2019

They have also self published a series of artist books:

- 'Intuitive Gestures– London: David Gill Gallery, 2017, Edition 500.
- 'Hybrideae– London: Fredrikson Stallard, 2017, Edition 150.
- 'Momentum– London: Fredrikson Stallard, 2015, Edition 350.

== Awards ==
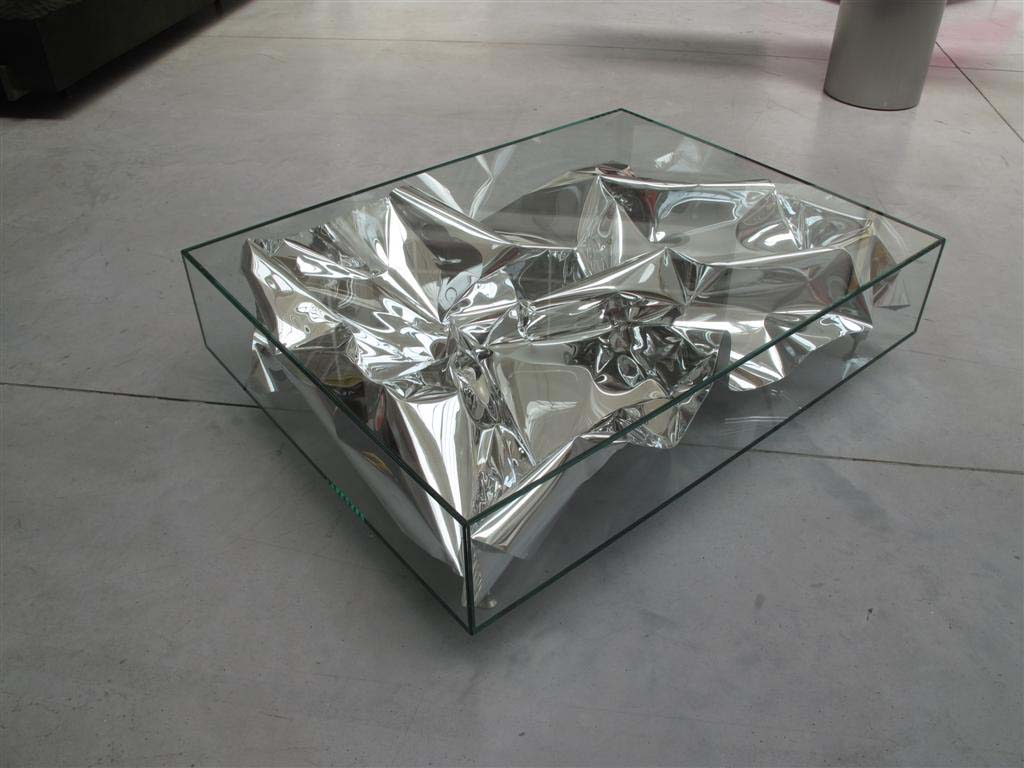
Silver Crush Table by Fredrikson Stallard (2011)

A work by Fredrikson Stallard was named one of top ten designs of the last decade by The Financial Times. and in the top 3 most collectible designs by HSBC Private Bank.

They have also received the following:

- 2017 – Design of the Year, Wallpaper Magazine
- 2016 – Designer of the Year, Nomination by Design Museum London
- 2014 – Best Trophy, Azure Magazine
- 2010 – Red Dot Design Award, Hyde Chair for Bernhardt Design
- 2006 – Fellowship to The Arts Foundation
