= Waterschool =

2018 documentary film

- Directed by: Tiffanie Hsu
- Produced by: Swarovski Foundation
- Release date: January 23, 2018 (Sundance)
- Language: English

Waterschool is a 2018 documentary film directed by Tiffanie Hsu and produced by the Swarovski Foundation. The film follows the experiences of six young female students who live along six of the world's major rivers: the Amazon, Nile, Mississippi, Danube, Ganges, and Yangtze. The film showcases the Waterschool program, an environmental education initiative that aims to empower young people to become water stewards and protect their communities and homes from water-related issues. The film premiered at the Sundance Film Festival and was also screened at the World Economic Forum in Davos, as well as Hong Kong and Cannes Film Festivals. The film received positive reviews from critics and audiences, who praised its vivid and poignant portrayal of the challenges and opportunities faced by the girls and their communities.

== Synopsis ==
The film is divided into six segments, each focusing on one of the rivers and one of the girls. The segments are.

- Amazon Ana, a 12-year-old girl from Brazil, lives in a remote village near the Amazon river. She learns about the importance of preserving the rainforest and the biodiversity of the river. She also participates in a cultural exchange with a group of indigenous students, who teach her about their traditions and values.
- Nile Nada, a 13-year-old girl from Uganda, lives near the Nile river, where water scarcity and pollution are major problems. She learns about the causes and effects of water contamination and how to purify water using simple methods. She also joins a local women's group, who advocate for better sanitation and hygiene in their community.
- Mississippi Sage, a 14-year-old girl from the United States, lives in New Orleans, a city that was devastated by Hurricane Katrina in 2005. She learns about the impact of climate change and sea level rise on the coastal areas and the wetlands. She also volunteers at a wildlife rehabilitation center, where she helps to care for injured animals.
- Danube Rida, a 15-year-old girl from Romania, lives in a town near the Danube river, where industrial waste and plastic pollution are threatening the ecosystem. She learns about the sources and solutions of plastic waste and how to reduce her own plastic consumption. She also joins a river cleanup campaign, where she collects and recycles plastic bottles.
- Ganges Manjot, a 16-year-old girl from India, lives in a city near the Ganges river, where religious rituals and cultural practices are intertwined with the water. She learns about the sacredness and the pollution of the river and how to balance her faith and her environmental awareness. She also visits a school for girls, where she learns about the importance of education and empowerment.
- Yangtze Yi, a 17-year-old girl from China, lives in a modern city near the Yangtze river, where rapid urbanization and economic development are transforming the landscape. She learns about the history and the future of the river and how to cope with the changes and the challenges. She also participates in a social innovation project, where she designs a water-saving device for her community.

== Production ==
The film, produced by the Swarovski Foundation, documents the impact of its Waterschool program, launched in 2010 with the United Nations. This initiative provides water education to over 500,000 students in 2,400 schools across 20 countries, addressing the global water crisis. Directed by Tiffanie Hsu, a UCLA graduate, the film captures the resilience of girls in six countries over two years. Edited by Arkesh Ajay, Gene Anderson, and Chelsi Johnston, it weaves together six narratives in Portuguese, English, Romanian, Hindi, Mandarin, and Swahili, overcoming language barriers. The original score by Alex Wurman incorporates diverse cultural elements, creating a musical dialogue with the communities.

== Release ==
The film premiered at the Sundance Film Festival on January 23, 2018, within the New Climate program, focusing on environmental issues. It garnered praise for cinematography, storytelling, and its message, winning the Audience Award for Best Documentary at the Bentonville Film Festival. Screened at the World Economic Forum in Davos on Water Day, Nadja Swarovski introduced the film. It showcased globally, including the Hong Kong International Film Festival, Cannes Film Festival's Positive Cinema Week, and festivals like Global Peace, Mill Valley, Heartland, and United Nations Association. Released on Netflix on July 9, 2018, it reaches a broad audience of over 130 million subscribers, also accessible on the Waterschool website for education and support.
