= Swarovski =

Austrian company

D. Swarovski KG
- Type: Kommanditgesellschaft (private)
- Industry: Fashion, crystal, and jewellery
- Founded: 1895; 131 years ago (as A. Kosmann, D. Swarovski & Co.)
- Founders: Daniel Swarovski; Armand Kosmann; Franz Weis
- Headquarters: Wattens, Innsbruck-Land District, Austria
- Area served: Worldwide
- Key people: Alexis Nasard (CEO); Giovanna Battaglia Engelbert (Creative Director); Markus Langes-Swarovski; Nadja Swarovski; Mathias Margreiter; Dr Christoph Swarovski; Andreas Buchbauer; Arno Pilcher
- Products: Crystal, genuine gemstones, created stones, accessories, and lighting
- Revenue: €2.7 billion
- Number of employees: ~29,000 (2020)
- Website: www.swarovski.com

Swarovski (/swɒˈrɒfski/, German: [svaˈrɔfski]) is an Austrian luxury goods conglomerate that designs, manufactures, distributes and sells jewellery, watches and glass. The company is based in Wattens, Tyrol and was founded in 1895 by Daniel Swarovski.

The company is split into three major industry areas: the Swarovski Crystal Business, which primarily produces crystal glass, jewellery, rhinestone, watches and accessories; Swarovski Optik, which produces optical instruments such as telescopes, telescopic sights for rifles, and binoculars; and Tyrolit, a manufacturer of grinding, sawing, drilling, and dressing tools, as well as a supplier of tools and machines.

Swarovski jewellery is regarded as one of the most prestigious manufacturers of luxury goods. FashionUnited ranked Swarovski on its Most Valuable Fashion Brands list as 22nd in 2025, with a brand value of $4.8 billion.

Today, the Swarovski Crystal Business is one of the highest-grossing business units within Swarovski, with a global reach of approximately 3,000 stores in roughly 170 countries, more than 29,000 employees, and a revenue of about 2.7 billion euros (in 2018).

Swarovski is now run by the fifth generation of family members. It has been announced, however, that for the first time in the company's key history, senior management positions will come to be filled by non-family members during the course of 2022.

== History ==
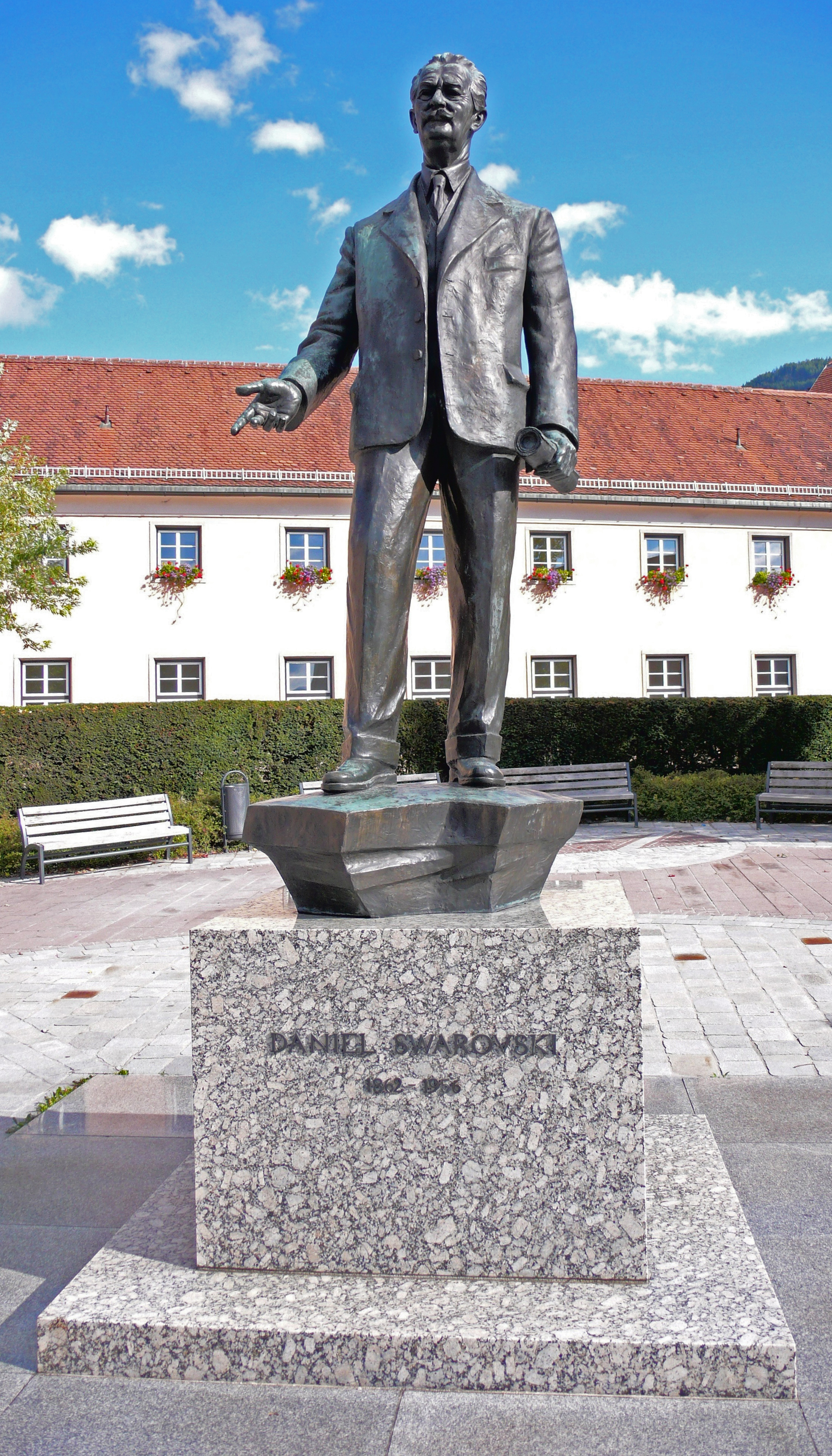
Statue of Daniel Swarovski (1862–1956), the founder of the company

Daniel Swarovski was born in Jiřetín pod Bukovou, a village in northern Bohemia (now the Czech Republic), 20 km (12 miles) from the current border with Poland. His father was a glass cutter and owned a small glass factory. It was there that the young Swarovski served an apprenticeship, becoming skilled in the art of glass-cutting. In 1892 he and business partner Armand Kosmann patented an electric cutting machine that facilitated the production of crystal glass.

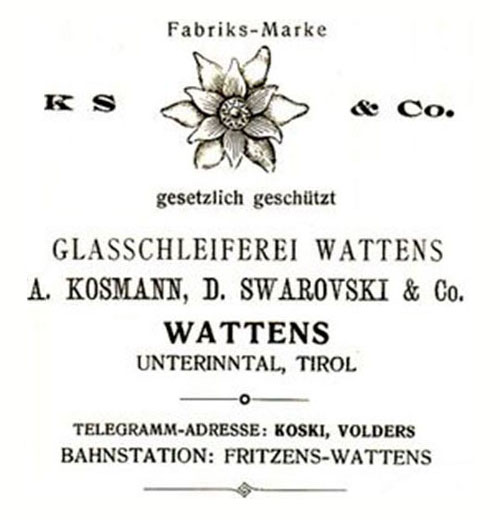
1899 advertisement for Kosmann, D. Swarovski & Co., featuring the edelweiss flower in its logo

Logo from 2016 to 2021

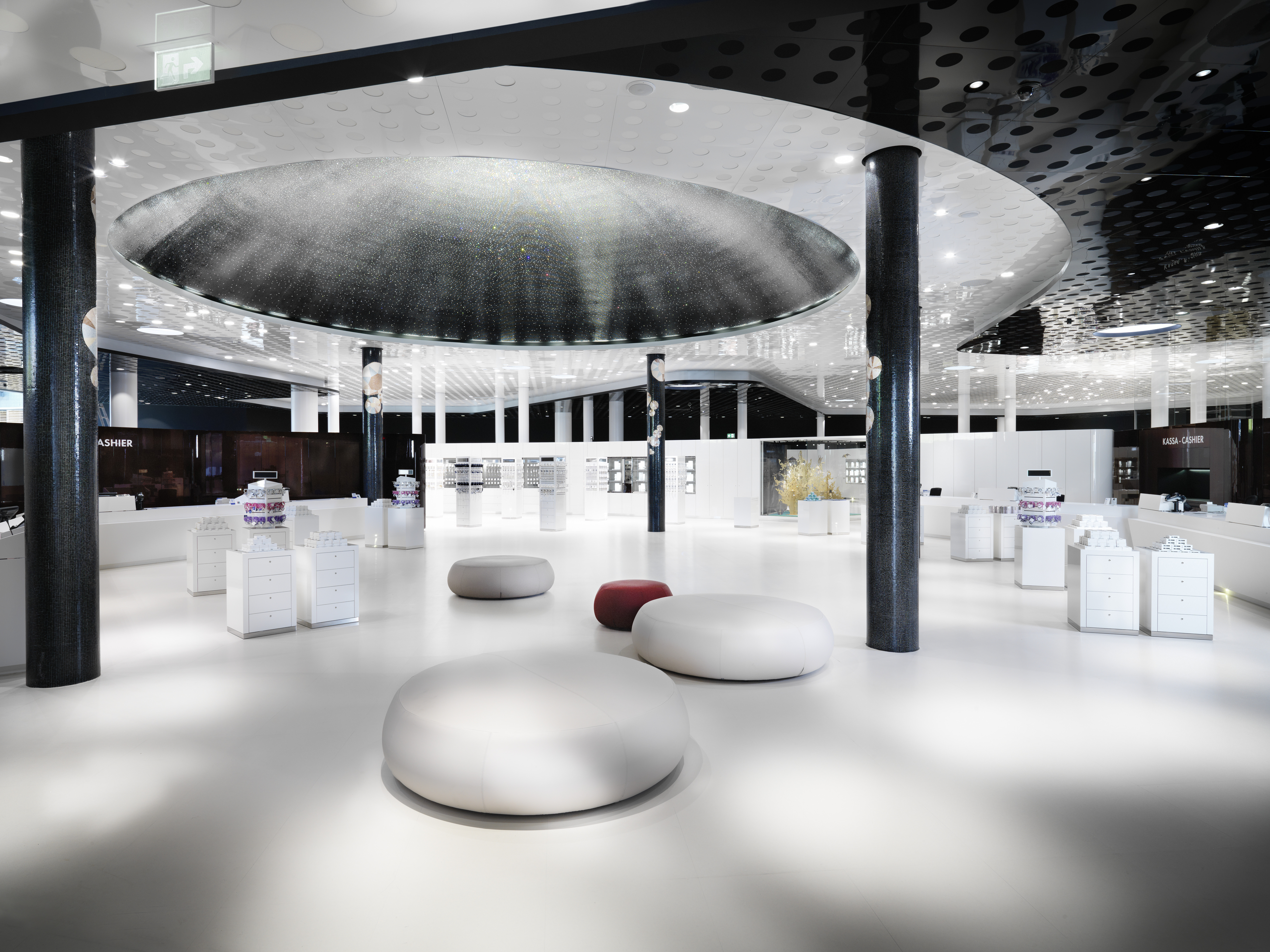
Swarovski Kristallwelten Store

In 1895, Swarovski, Armand Kosmann, and Franz Weis founded the Swarovski company, originally known as A. Kosmann, D. Swarovski & Co. and shortened to KS & Co. The company established a crystal-cutting factory in Wattens, Tyrol (Austria), to take advantage of local hydroelectricity for the energy-intensive grinding processes Daniel Swarovski had patented. This factory was home to the first crystal-cutting machines that revolutionized the jewelry business by creating a method for the mass production of crystals. Swarovski's vision was to make "a diamond for everyone" by making crystals affordable.

In 1899, it first used the edelweiss flower in its logo and expanded to France, where it was known as 'Pierres Taillées du Tyrol' (lit. 'Cut stones from Tyrol'). In 1919, Swarovski founded Tyrolit, bringing the grinding and polishing tools from the crystal business into a different market.

In 1935, Swarovski's son Wilhelm created a customized pair of binoculars, which led to the launch of Swarovski Optik 14 years later. Swarovski Optik manufactures optical instruments such as binoculars, spotting scopes, rifle scopes and telescopes.

In 1977, Swarovski entered the United States' jewelry market.

Remaining a family-run business, Swarovski appointed Robert Buchbauer, the great-great-grandson of company founder Daniel Swarovski, as its new CEO in April 2020 with Mathias Margreiter serving as the company's CFO. Buchbauer had previously served as chairman of the company's executive board and as head of its consumer goods division, positions he retained after being appointed as CEO. Reported at the time as a major company shake-up, the change would see the founder's great-great-granddaughter, Nadja Swarovski, lose her roles managing the company's communications strategy along with its fine jewelry label Atelier Swarovski; she had previously become the first female member of the Swarovski executive board in 2012, a role she retained along with responsibility for the company's sustainability efforts and its charitable foundation. Alongside the executive changes, the company also closed 750 retail stores, laid off some 6,000 employees, and promoted its B2B creative director Giovanna Battaglia Engelbert to serve as the Global Creative Director of Swarovski Group, the first so-named person in the company's 125-year history.

Tasked with the full creative direction of Swarovski and with the responsibility to "re-imagine [its] product portfolio across all divisions", Engelbert released her first retail collection for the company in February 2021 with a second collection released in September of the same year; both drew on archival references to designs that founder Daniel Swarovski had created for the company.

Expanding the company's retail offering, Engelbert also hired Marina Raphael, the eponymous handbag brand founded by Swarovski-family member Marina Raphael, to design and develop Swarovski's first handbag line, released under the company's Atelier Swarovski marque.

Further shake-ups to the company's management would follow in late 2021; less than 18 months into their roles, Robert Buchbauer and Mathias Margreiter were announced to be stepping down from their CEO and CFO positions. Shareholder disputes over restructuring plans for the company were cited as the cause of the change. In October 2021, Michele Molon was appointed as the company's interim CEO with Frederik Westring announced as its CFO. The change would mark the first time that Swarovski would be led by a non-family member, with Italian-born Molon long having worked at the company but unrelated to founder Daniel Swarovski.

=== Involvement with Nazism ===
Members of the Swarovski family were early, active and enthusiastic champions of Nazism, and at least six of its members maintained membership in the illegal party prior to Austria's annexation to Nazi Germany on 12 March 1938. Three weeks earlier, 500 marchers in the Tyrolean town of Wattens held a torchlight procession that ended with chants of "Sieg Heil" and "Heil Hitler". The majority of the participants, police determined, were Swarovski plant employees, among them Swarovski family heirs Alfred, Wilhelm and Friedrich.

In its report to the state police on 14 February 1947, the Innsbruck district administrator called company head Alfred Swarovski "an enthusiastic member of the NSDAP". Alfred Swarovski praised Hitler at business gatherings and took actions as a regional business leader to ensure that "Tyrolean industry could be integrated as smoothly as possible into the enormous gears of the economy of Greater Germany and into the National Socialist economic order". He sent "grateful loyalty greetings" to Adolf Hitler on his 49th birthday and arranged a donation of 100,000 shillings for Hitler to establish a holiday home in Tyrol.

The company exploited its political connections and stewardship of the regional business association to emerge stronger from the Nazi era. During the war it diversified its production and expanded its business lines, adding abrasives, optical devices, telescopes, binoculars and other product lines and growing from 500 to almost 1,200 employees between the Anschluss and March 1944.

Meanwhile, Nazi records suggest that Kosmann, the company's Jewish co-founder, was deported and likely murdered.

"From my party affiliation, I only took advantage of the fact that it was possible for me as a party member to initiate the negotiations necessary for maintaining the company and to bring it to a successful conclusion with the responsible economic agencies of the Reich," Alfred Swarovski told the Innsbruck People's Court after the war.

In 1994, historian Horst Schreiber wrote about Swarovski's past but was not granted access to company archives.

The contemporary Swarovski company commissioned historian Dieter Stiefel as "a step towards dealing with our history in a serious and very pro-active manner", board spokesman Markus Langes-Swarovski said in 2018; however, the study was not published because, Langes-Swarovski said, "Swarovski is a company that generally tries to keep the owners' personal stories largely out of the public eye because it does nothing for the business."

== Products ==
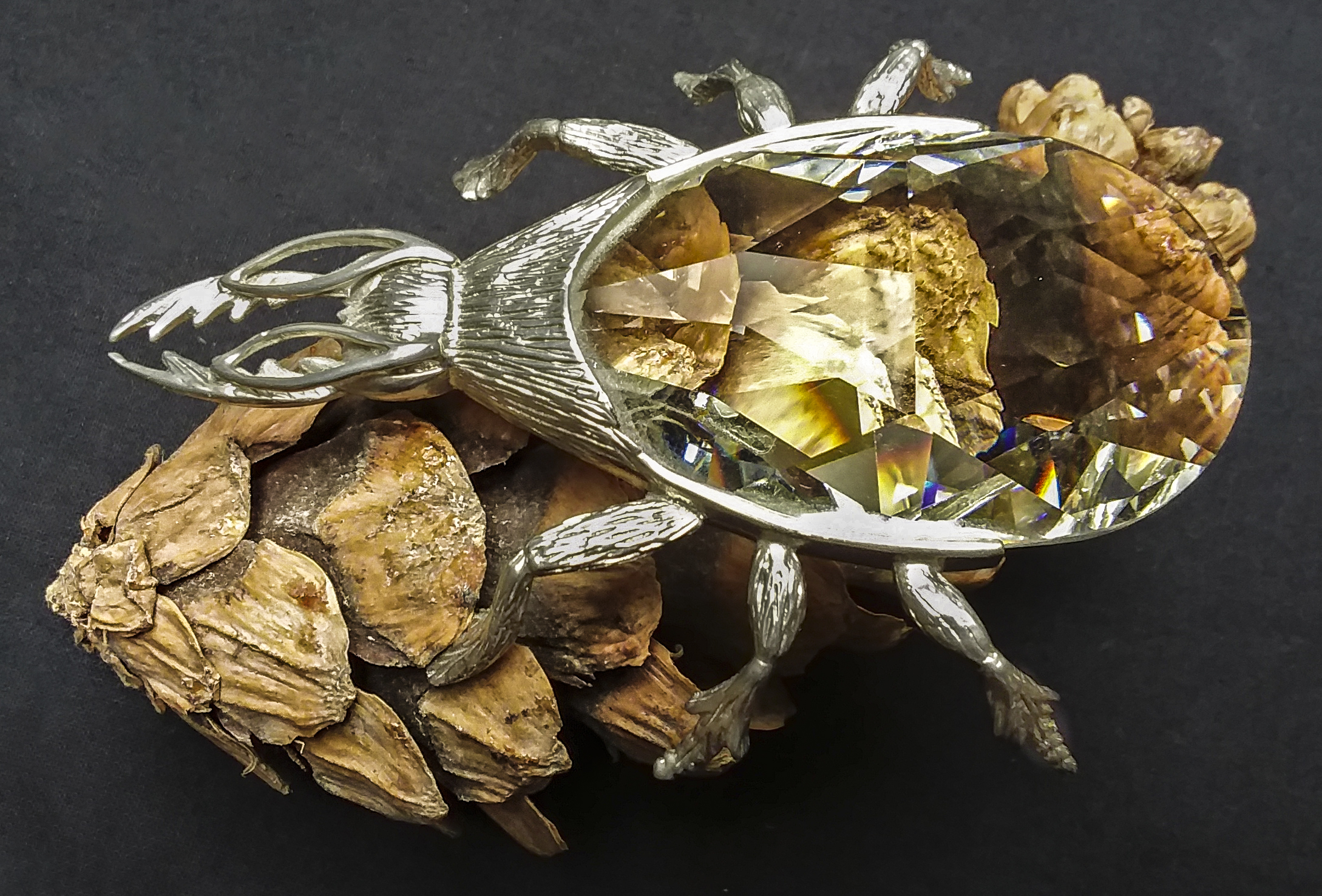
Beetle designed as bottle opener, Swarovski, about 1978, made of rhodium and crystal glass

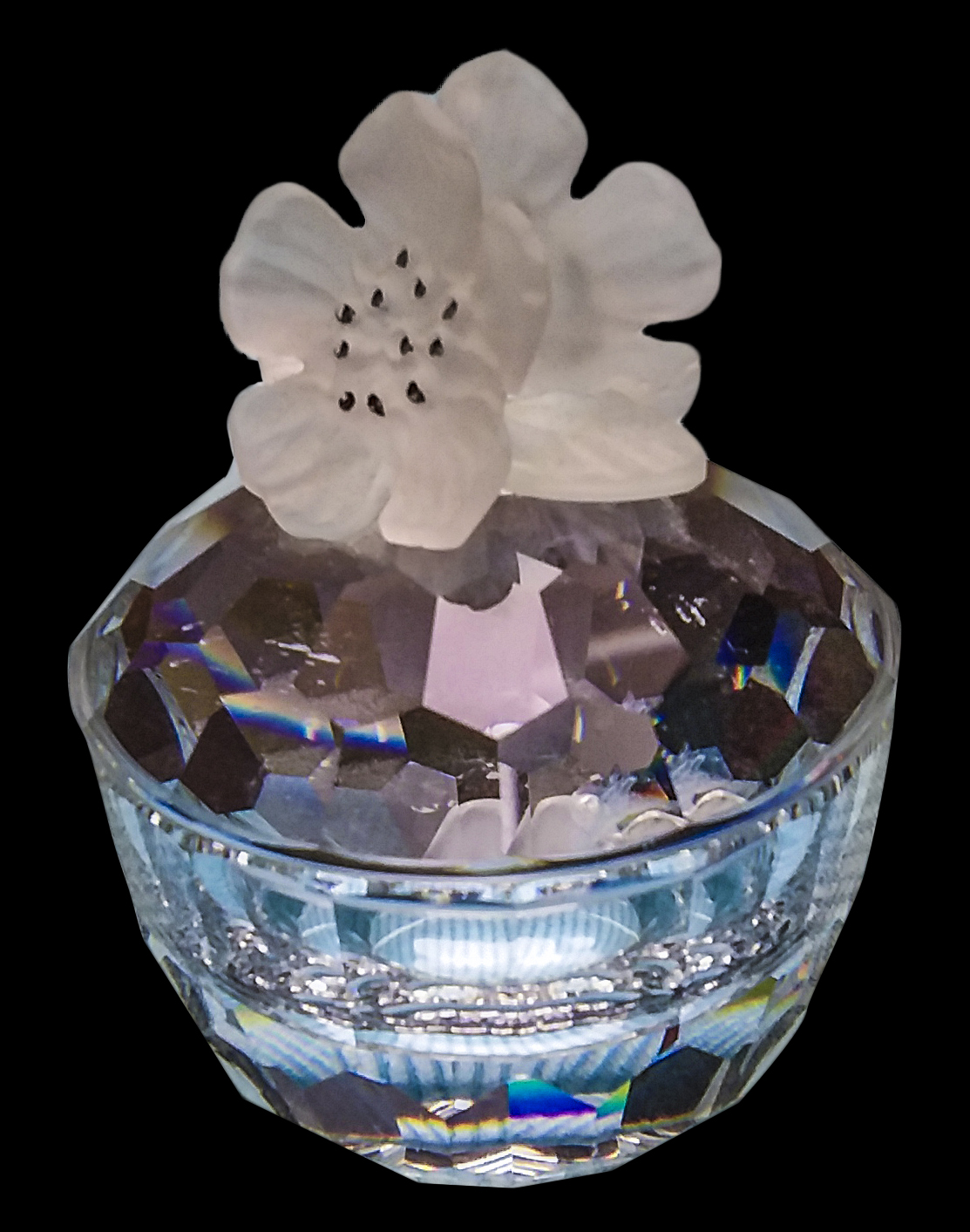
Container with "potlid", Swarovski. Made of crystal and opaque glass

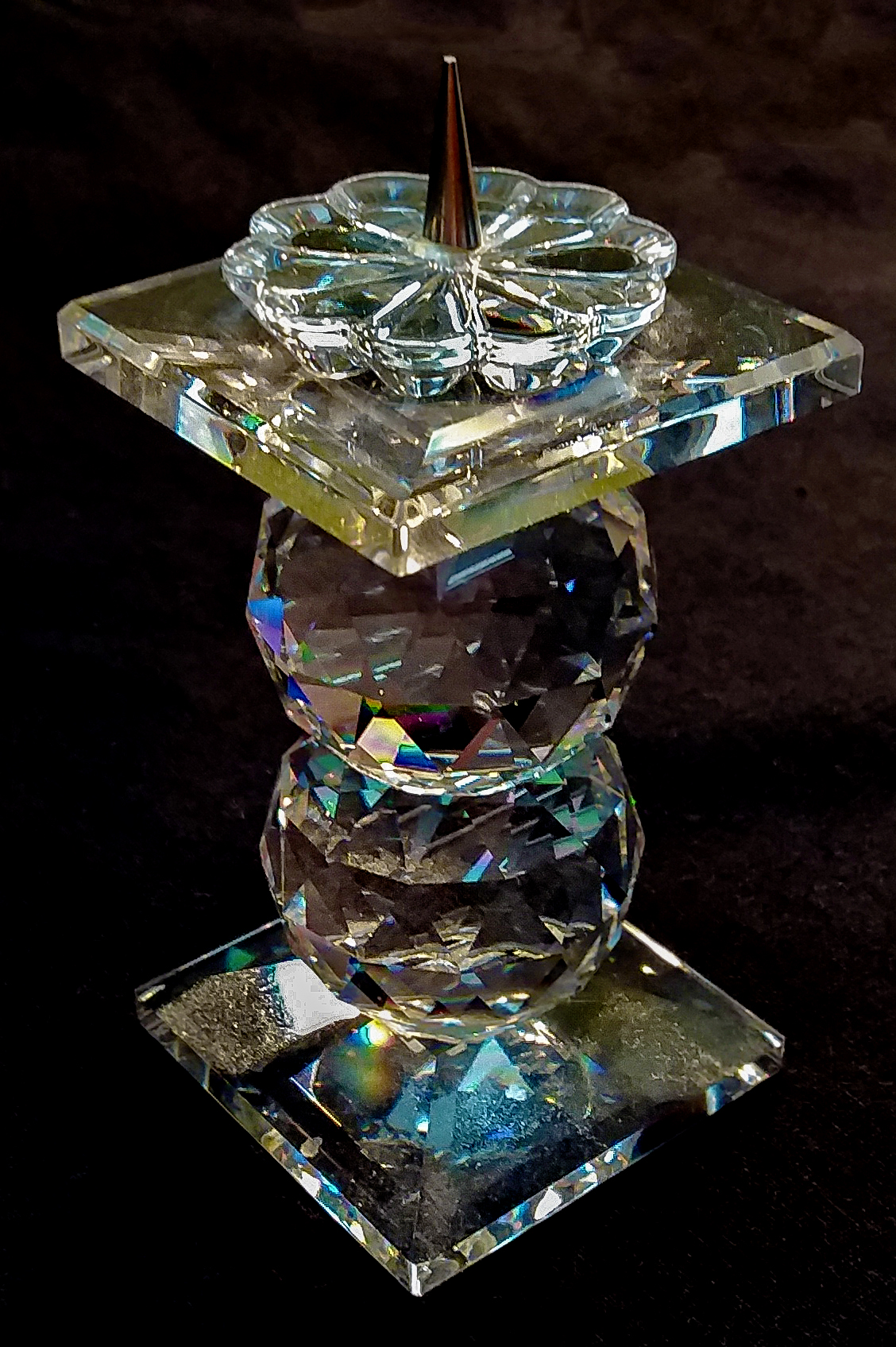
Candle holder, crystal glass, Swarovski

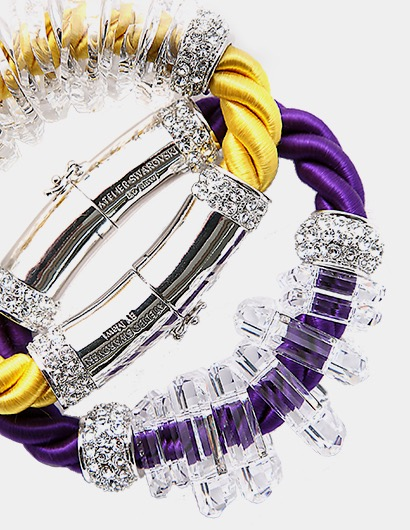
Mawi x Atelier Swarovski

Swarovski makes products such as glass sculptures, miniature, jewellery, rhinestones, watches, home decor and chandeliers.

All sculptures are marked with a logo. The original edelweiss flower Swarovski logo was replaced by an S.A.L. logo, which was replaced with the swan logo in 1988.

Swarovski glass is produced by melting a mixture of quartz sand, soda, potash and other ingredients at high temperatures. Lead, usually used in the form of lead oxide, is no longer used and all Swarovski crystal glass produced since 2012 has been lead-free. To create crystal glass that lets light refract in a rainbow spectrum, Swarovski coats some of its products with special metallic chemical coatings. For example Aurora Borealis, or AB, gives the surface a rainbow appearance. Other coatings are named by the company, including Crystal Transmission, Volcano, Aurum, Shimmer, and Dorado. Coatings may be applied to only part of an object; others are coated twice and thus are designated AB 2X, Dorado 2X, etc.

In 2004 Swarovski released Xilion, a copyrighted cut designed to optimize the brilliance of Roses (components with flat backs) and Chatons (diamond cut).

The Swarovski Group includes Tyrolit (makers of abrasive and cutting tools); Swareflex (reflective and luminous road markings); Swarovski Gemstones (synthetic and natural gemstones); and Swarovski Optik (optical instruments such as binoculars and rifle scopes).

Since 2006 the Royal Canadian Mint has issued collectors' coins with Swarovski crystal components. The 2006 crystal-snowflake coin was gold (face value $300), with the reverse having six lens-shaped iridescent crystals on a snowflake. Subsequent years' crystal-snowflake coins have been $20 silver coins featuring different coloured crystals. In 2018 the Canadian mint issued 12 different birthstone coins, each with a different Swarovski crystal. The Canadian mint's 12-coin 2019 zodiac series will feature 20 Swarovski crystals on each coin.

In 2014 Tristan da Cunha issued a five-crown Christmas coin in which a small Swarovski crystal is set in the guiding star behind a coloured picture of one of the magi.

Swarovski launched its first watch collection in 1999. The watches offered by Swarovski are Swiss made.

== Exhibitions and museum ==
The company runs a crystal-themed museum, the "Swarovski Kristallwelten (Crystal Worlds)" at its original Wattens site (near Innsbruck, Austria). The Crystal Worlds Center is fronted by a grass-covered head, the mouth of which is a fountain.

Swarovski work was exhibited at Asia's "Fashion Jewel5ry & Accessories Fair" based on the concept of a single continuous beam of fragmented light travelling through a crystal.

In 2012, Swarovski collaborated with the London Design Museum to present an exhibition mixing digital technology with crystals.

== Swarovski businesses ==
Active-Crystals

In 2007, Swarovski formed a partnership with electronics giant Philips to produce the "Active-Crystals" consumer electronics range. This includes six USB Memory keys and four in-ear headphones, and in 2008 they included Bluetooth wireless earpieces for the brand, all with some form of Swarovski crystal on them as decoration.

Atelier Swarovski
Atelier Swarovski collaborates with major luxury designers to create jewelry collections as well as architecture and home pieces (as part of the Atelier Swarovski Home department).
Viktor and Rolf, Jean-Paul Gaultier, Fredrikson Stallard, Zaha Hadid, John Pawson, Daniel Libeskind, Prince Dimitri, Karl Lagerfeld, Christopher Kane, Mary Katranzou, Iris Apfel, Stephen Webster, Anna della Russo and Jason Wu have each designed collections for Atelier Swarovski.

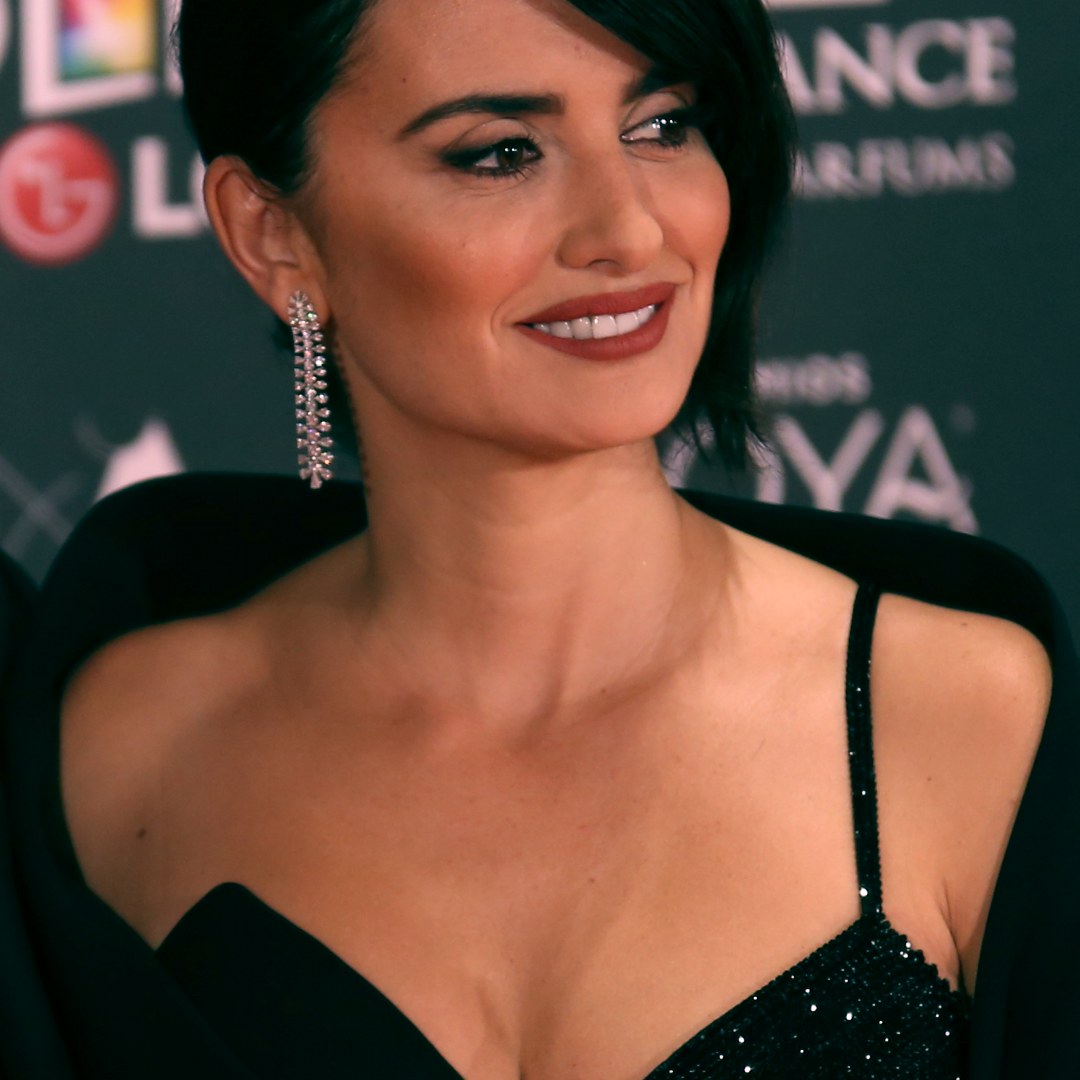
Penelope Cruz wearing a custom Atelier Versace black gown with Swarovski crystals to the Goya 2017 Awards

Penelope Cruz was the latest global brand ambassador for Atelier Swarovski.
Japanese boy band Snow Man member Shota Watanabe was chosen as the jewelry brand's first ambassador in Japan, as revealed on October 1, 2024.

Chamilia

Chamilia creates exclusive beads, charms, and jewelry, many with sparkling crystal details.

Swareflex
A road safety products specialist.

Swarovski
Crystal-based animal and other figurines, ornaments and fashion accessories.

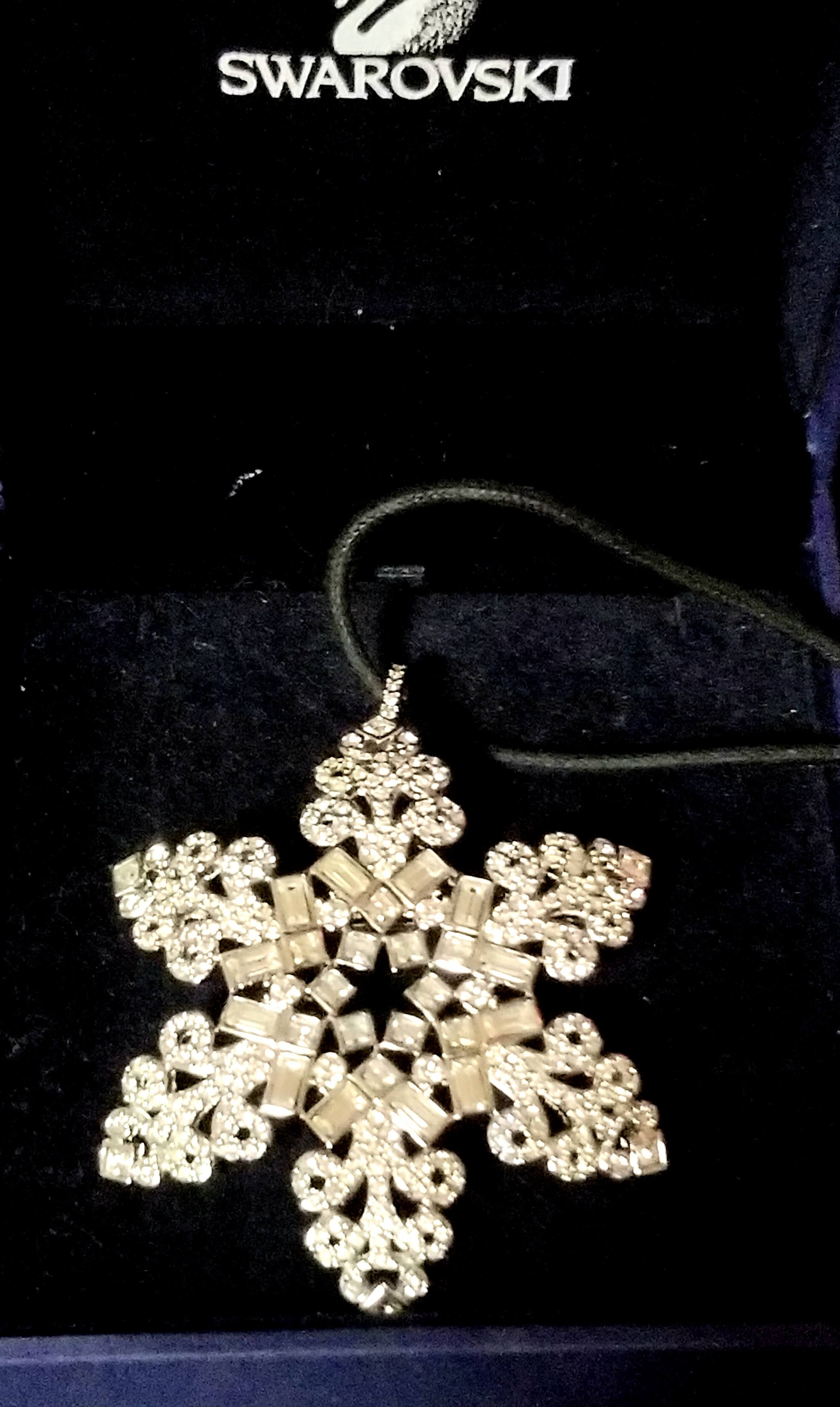
Swarovski crystal snowflake pendant/brooch (2004 collection)

Swarovski Crystal Palace
Avant-garde lighting and design (chandeliers etc.)

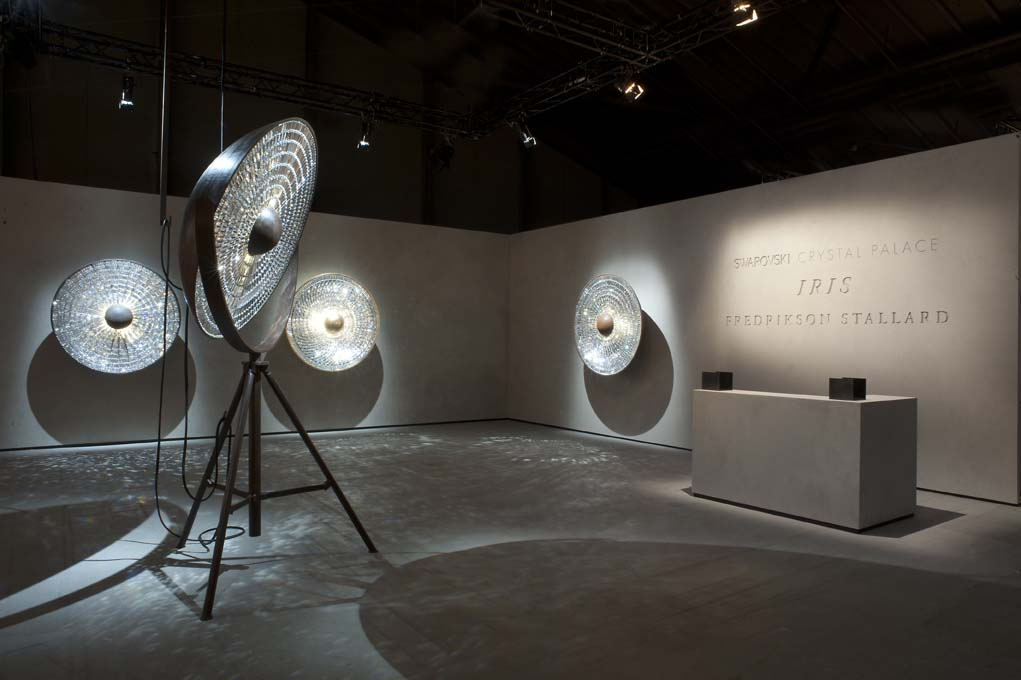
IRIS by Fredrikson Stallard for Swarovski Crystal Palace (2011)

Swarovski Gemstone Business
Gemstone designs.

Swarovski Kristallwelten
Museum, Art and Entertainment.

Swarovski Lighting
Finished lighting products and solutions with crystal for architecture.

Swarovski Optik
Optics.

Swarovski Professional
Crystal elements produced by Swarovski

Touchstone Crystal
Swarovski's direct sales company for ready-made jewelry.

Tyrolit
A manufacturer of bonded grinding and cutoff wheels.

== Figurines and collectibles ==
Swarovski's figurines are collectible; its first produced figurine was a stylized mouse. A smaller version of this mouse, now labelled the "replica mouse," is still sold to this day. Swarovski Elements crystals were included in some collectible silver coins issued by the Royal Canadian Mint in 2009.

In November 2014, Victoria's Secret revealed a redesign of its Heavenly Luxe perfume bottle with Swarovski crystals.

== Sponsorship and crystal product placement ==
Swarovski's Communications and Branding Business has placed Swarovski crystal in a number of films, theatre productions and fashion shows over the last hundred years, including in various James Bond movies.

A notable client of Swarovski was Liberace, who acquired a large number of their rhinestones and used them to cover many items he owned, including his piano and his car. Liberace's success and fame were a major driver for Swarovski's brand, growth and success, and the company recognized this by creating an exceptionally large rhinestone dubbed "the Heart of Liberace". This piece, weighing 115,000 carats (20 kg; 50 lb) was presented to Liberace in 1985. It is now on display as part of the Liberace exhibition at the Hollywood Car Museum in Las Vegas. The crystal has 134 facets, and measures 31 by 23 cm (12.2 by 9 inches). At the time, the crystal was valued at $50,000 (equivalent to $146,000 in 2024).

== Partnerships ==
Since 2004, Swarovski has provided the 2.7-meter-diameter (9 ft), 250-kilogram (550 lb) star or snowflake that tops the Rockefeller Center Christmas Tree in New York City. Smaller versions of this are sold as Annual Edition ornaments.

Swarovski owned the Austrian football club FC Swarovski Tirol from 1986 to 1992.

In 2018, celebrity chef Nadiya Hussain, TV personality Katie Piper, and CoppaFeel founder Kris Hallenga, were announced as Swarovski's latest ambassadors, and starred in the brand's ongoing #BrillianceforAll campaign.

In 2019, Swarovski partnered with Dior for its exhibition at the Victoria and Albert Museum, featuring archival designer pieces emblazoned with Swarovski crystal.

Swarovski annually hosts the Designers of the Future Award in recognition of young and up-and-coming designers. The previous winners of the Swarovski Designers of the Future Award include influential designers and architects: Ross Lovegrove, Greg Lynn, Troika, Fredrikson Stallard, Erwin Redl, Eyal Burstein, Asif Khan, Guilherme Torres, Jeanne Gang and Mexico City-based global architecture and design practice Fernando Romero Enterprise (FR-EE). The 2018 winners were Frank Kolkman, an experimental Dutch designer focused on robotic technologies; Study O Portable, a research-based Dutch-Japanese practice making objects about the designed environment, and Yosuke Ushigome of TAKRAM, a creative Japanese technologist specializing in emerging technologies.

In November 2023, Swarovski collaborated with the shapewear brand Skims on a new collection of body jewelry.

In April 2024, Swarovski unveiled a collection in collaboration with Marvel. Accordingly, Swarovski expanded its collection of decorative figurines with creations paying homage to the superheroes of the Marvel franchises.

== Gallery ==
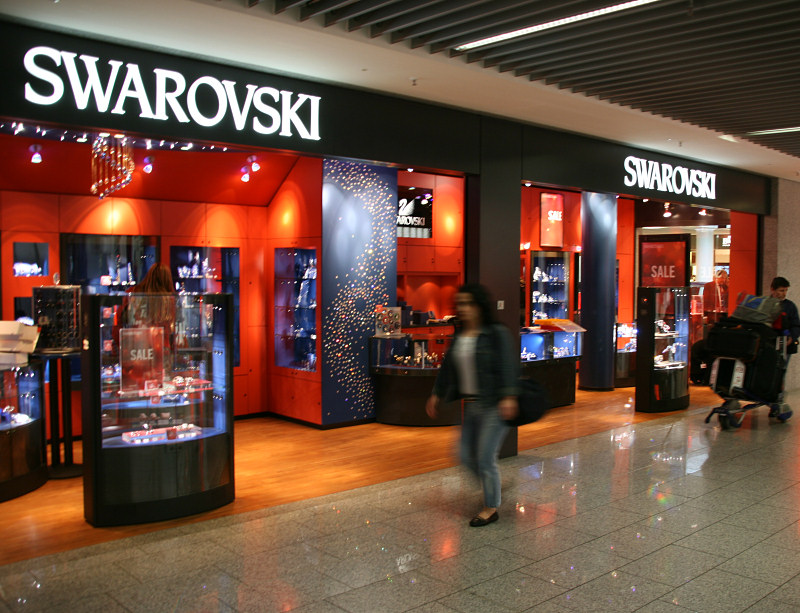
Swarovski store in Frankfurt

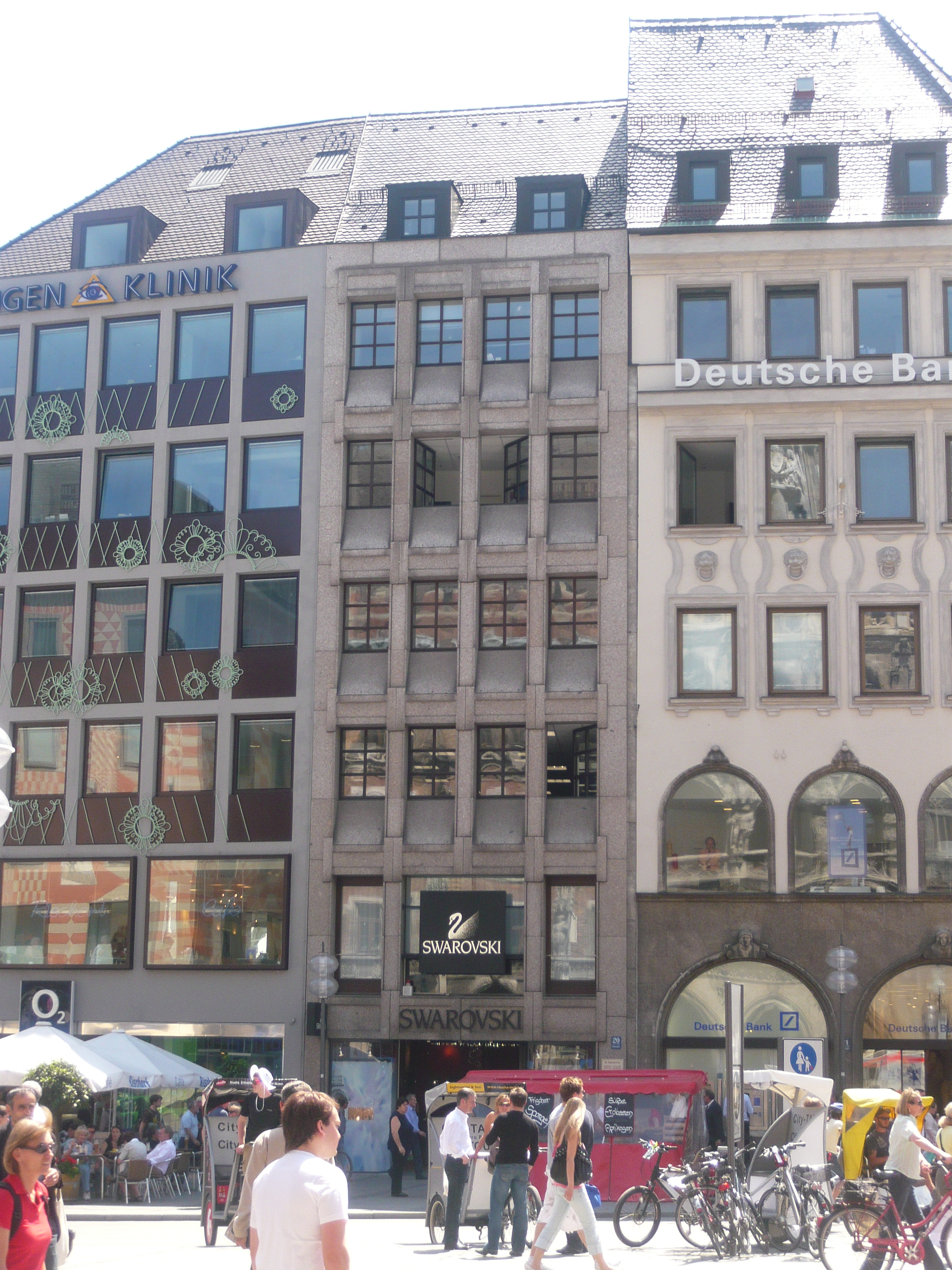
Swarovski store in Munich

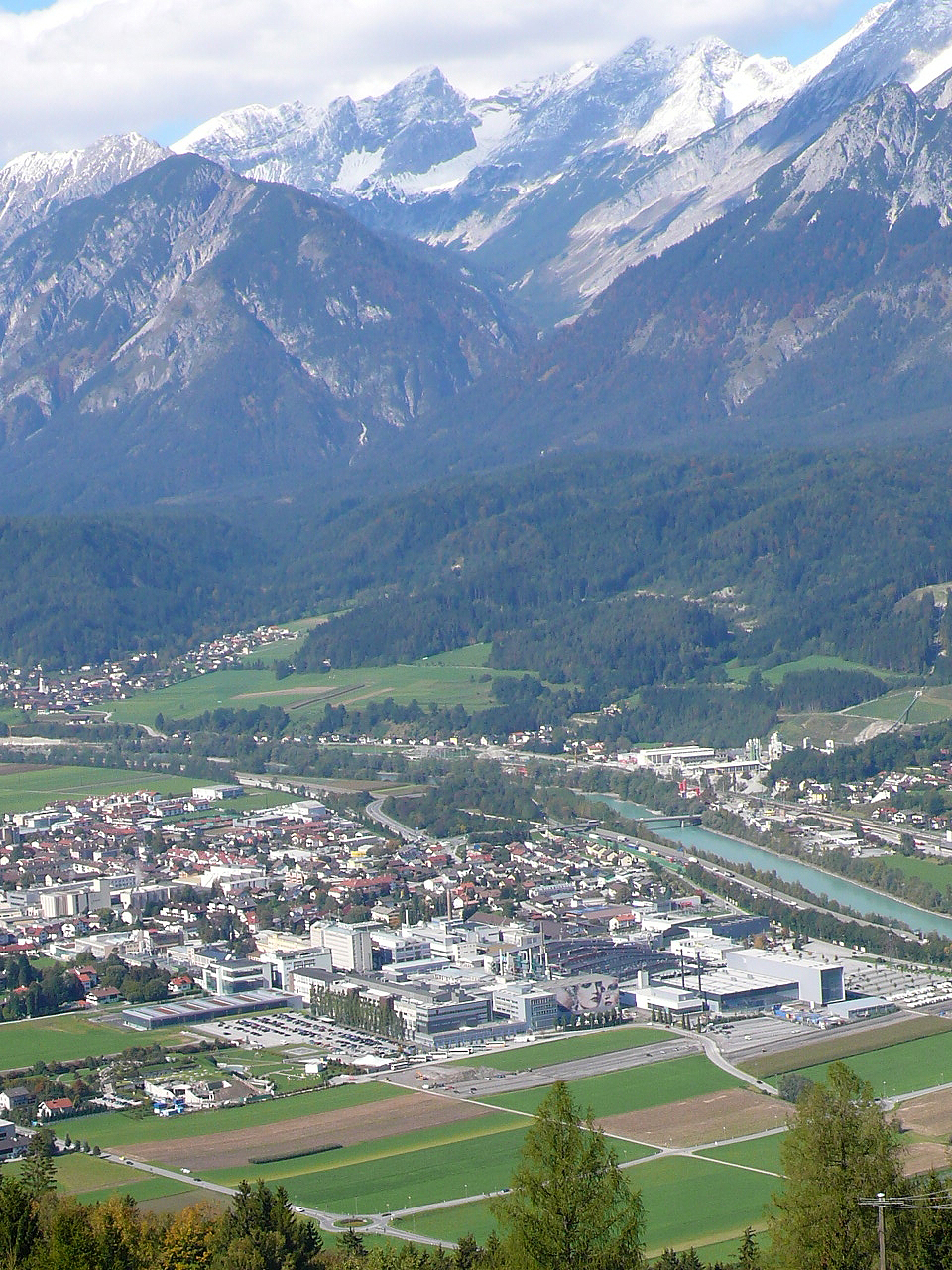
Swarovski Wattens

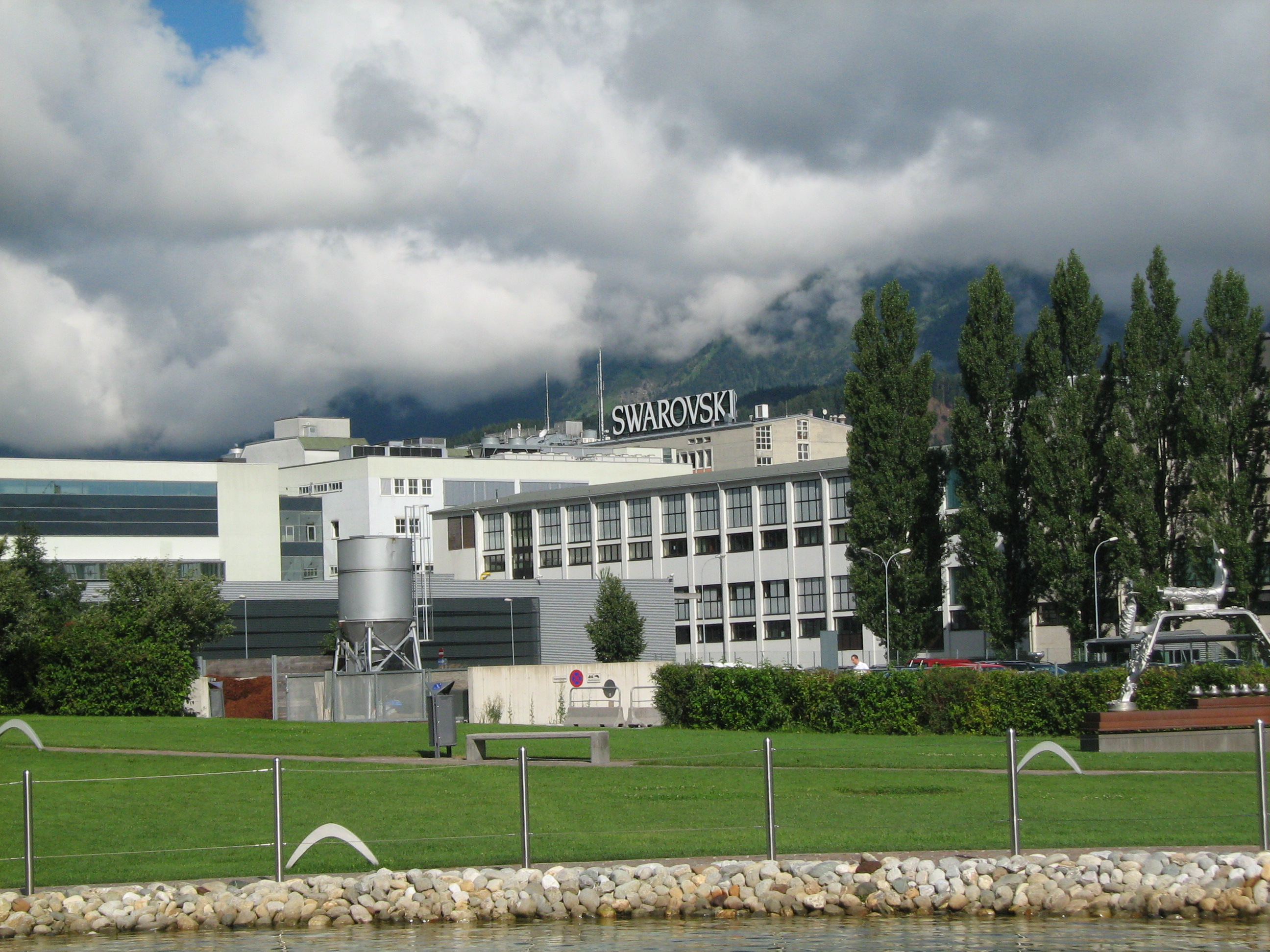
The factory in Wattens

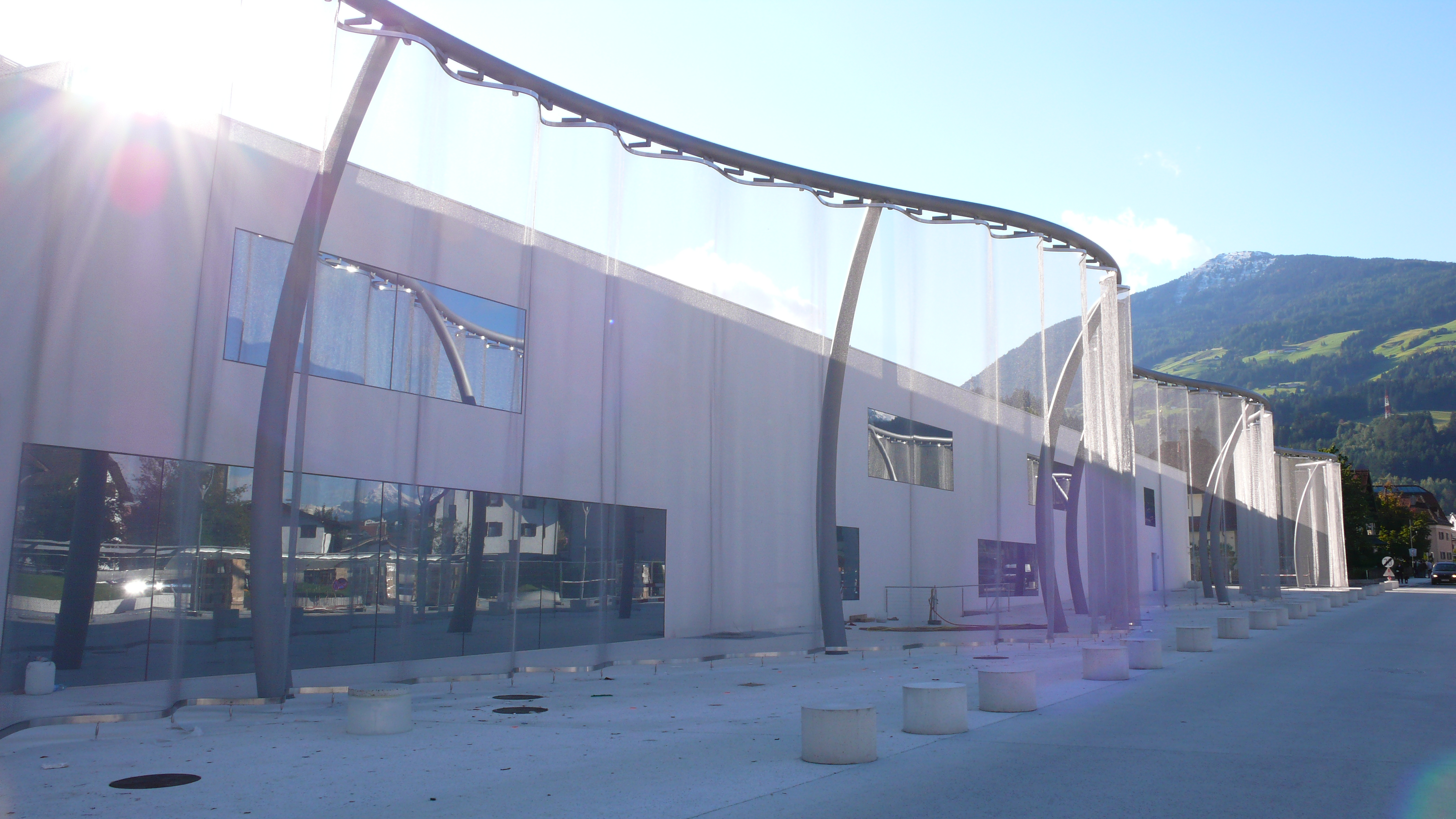
Swarovskistraße Wattens September 2007

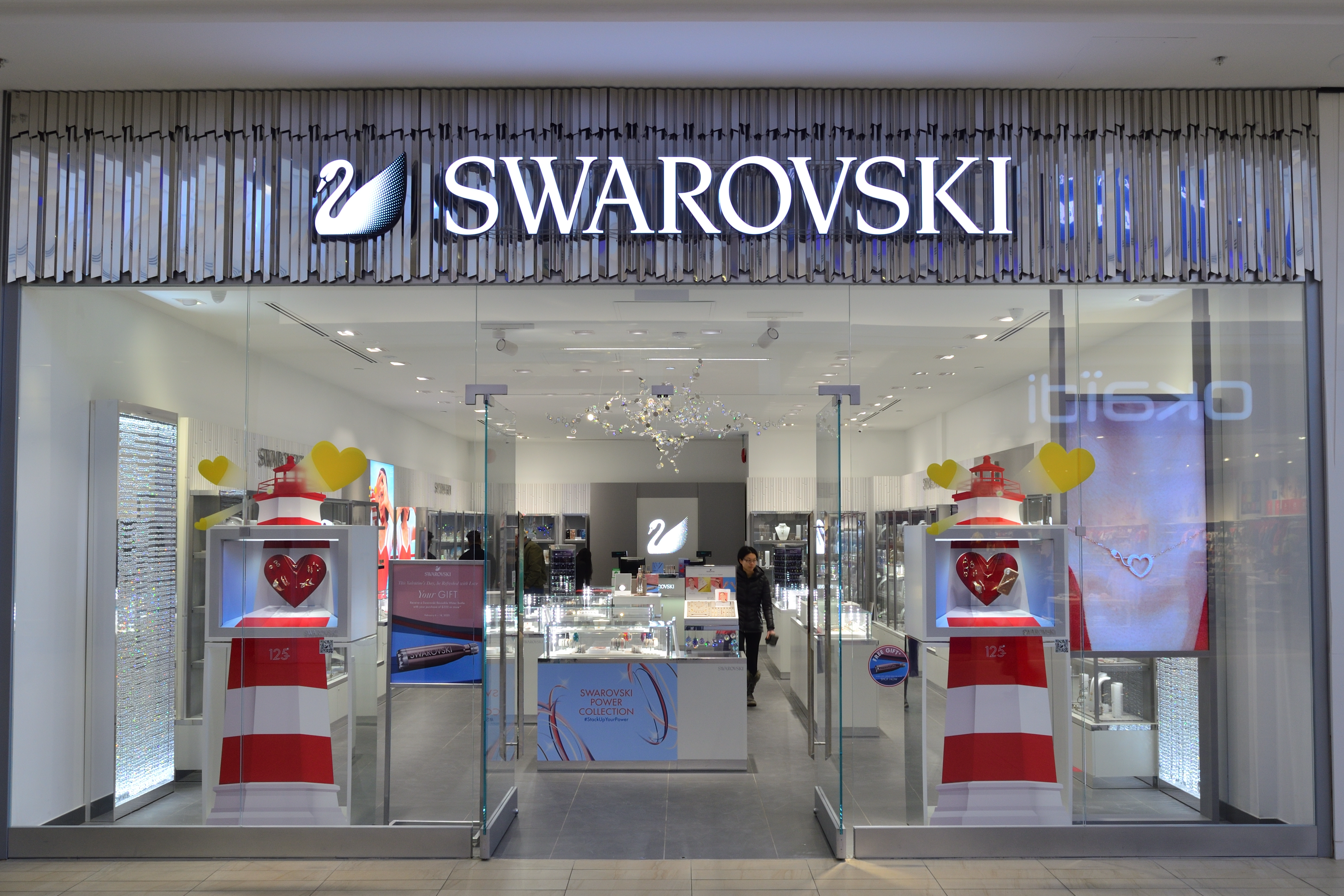
Swarovski in Richmond Hill, Ontario

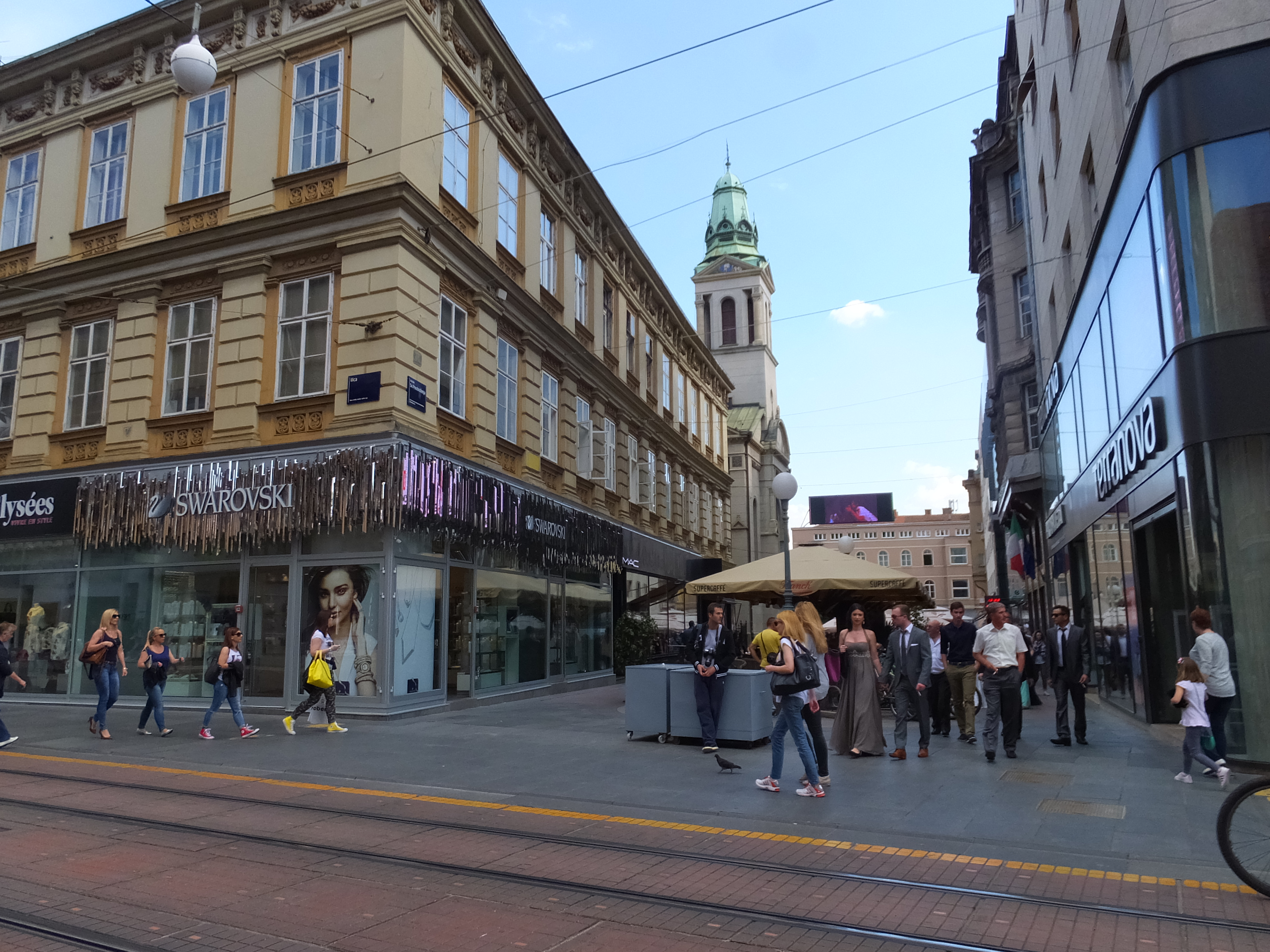
Swarovski store in Zagreb

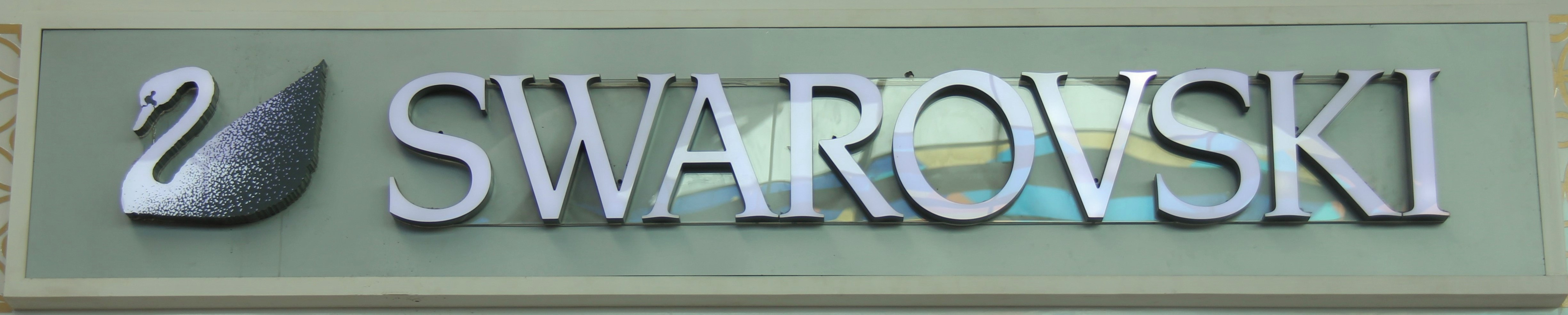
Swarovski signage and logo at its store at Delhi Airport

== See also ==
- Swarovski Kristallwelten (Crystal Worlds)
