= Svárov =

Svárov may refer to places in the Czech Republic:

- Svárov (Kladno District), a municipality and village in the Central Bohemian Region
- Svárov (Uherské Hradiště District), a municipality and village in the Zlín Region
- Svárov, a village and part of Stráž nad Nisou in the Liberec Region
- Svárov, a village and part of Velké Opatovice in the South Moravian Region
