= Jiřetín pod Bukovou =

- Municipality
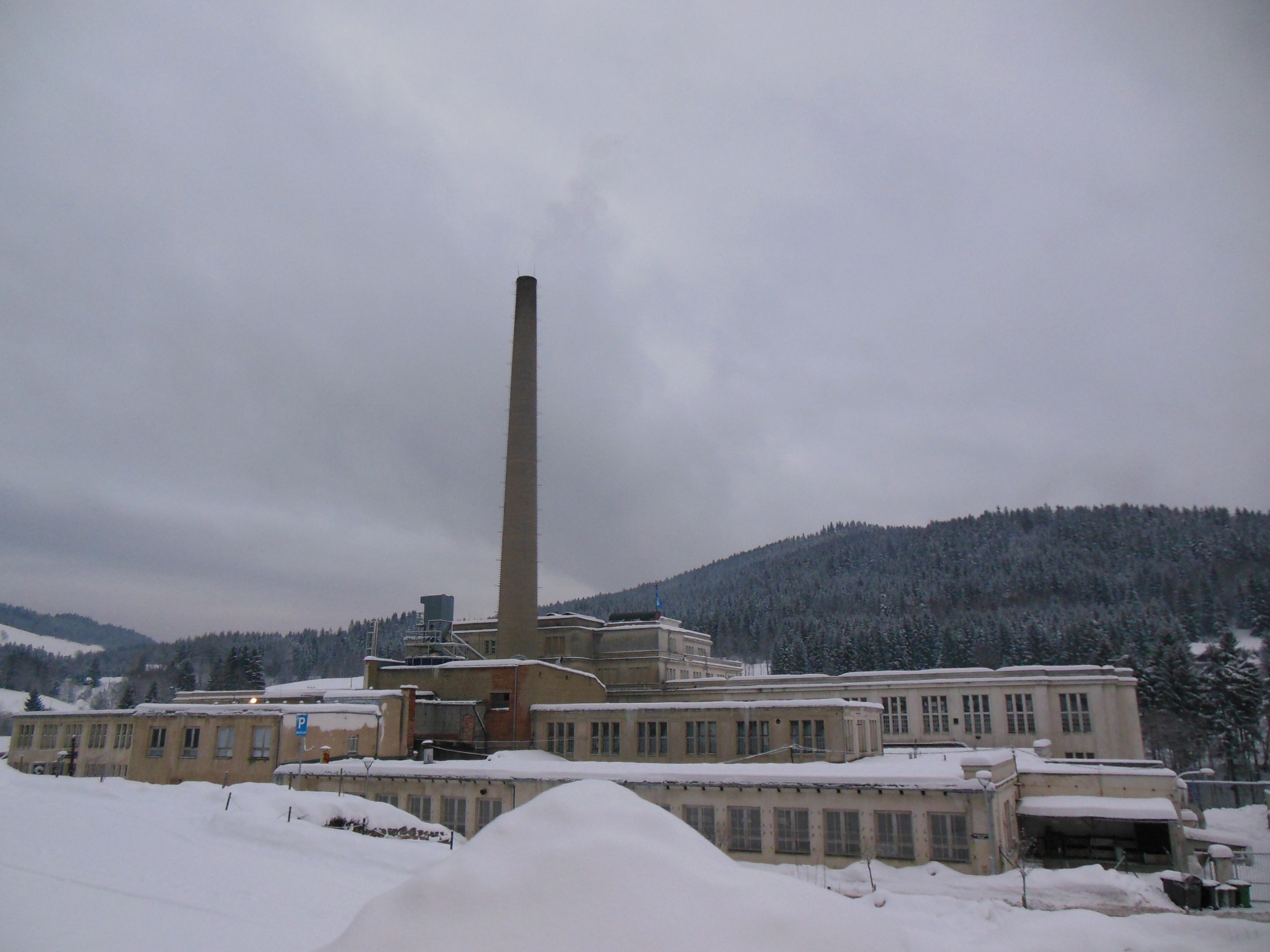
- Wooden toys factory

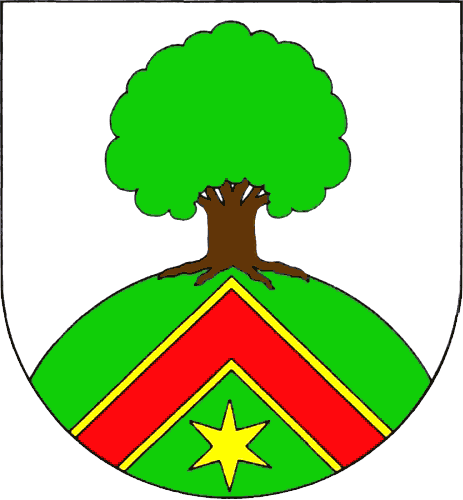
- Flag Coat of arms

- Location in the Czech Republic
- Coordinates: 50°45′21″N 15°15′47″E
- Country: Czech Republic
- Region: Liberec
- District: Jablonec nad Nisou
- First mentioned: 1687

Area
  - Total: 3.31 km^{2} (1.28 sq mi)
- Elevation: 525 m (1,722 ft)

Population (2026-01-01)
  - Total: 431
  - Density: 130/km^{2} (337/sq mi)
- Time zone: UTC+1 (CET)
  - Summer (DST): UTC+2 (CEST)
- Postal code: 468 43
- Website: www.jiretinpb.cz

Jiřetín pod Bukovou (until 1950 Jiřetín; German: Georgenthal) is a municipality and village in Jablonec nad Nisou District in the Liberec Region of the Czech Republic. It has about 400 inhabitants.

== Demographics ==
Historical population
Year	Pop.	±%
1869	317	—
1880	366	+15.5%
1890	358	−2.2%
1900	403	+12.6%
1910	540	+34.0%
1921	537	−0.6%
1930	550	+2.4%
1950	279	−49.3%
1961	403	+44.4%
1970	470	+16.6%
1980	575	+22.3%
1991	612	+6.4%
2001	656	+7.2%
2011	516	−21.3%
2021	427	−17.2%
Source: Censuses

== Notable people ==
- Daniel Swarovski (1862–1956), Czech-Austrian glass cutter, jeweler and entrepreneur
