= Mary Katrantzou =

Greek fashion designer (born 1983)

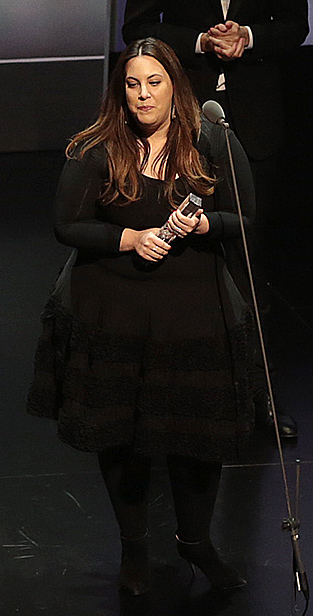
- Born: 29 January 1983 (age 42); Athens, Greece
- Education: Rhode Island School of Design; Central St. Martins (BA, MA)
- Label: Mary Katrantzou
- Awards: Swiss Textiles Award; British Fashion Award for Emerging Talent; BFC/Vogue Designer Fashion Fund

Mary Katrantzou (born January 1983) is a Greek fashion designer who lives and works in London.

== Early life ==
Mary Katrantzou was born in Athens, Greece to an interior designer mother and a father who trained in textile engineering.

Katrantzou moved to the United States in 2003 to study architecture at the Rhode Island School of Design, but later transferred to Central Saint Martins College of Art and Design where she completed her bachelor's degree in 2005 and her master's degree in 2008.

== Career ==
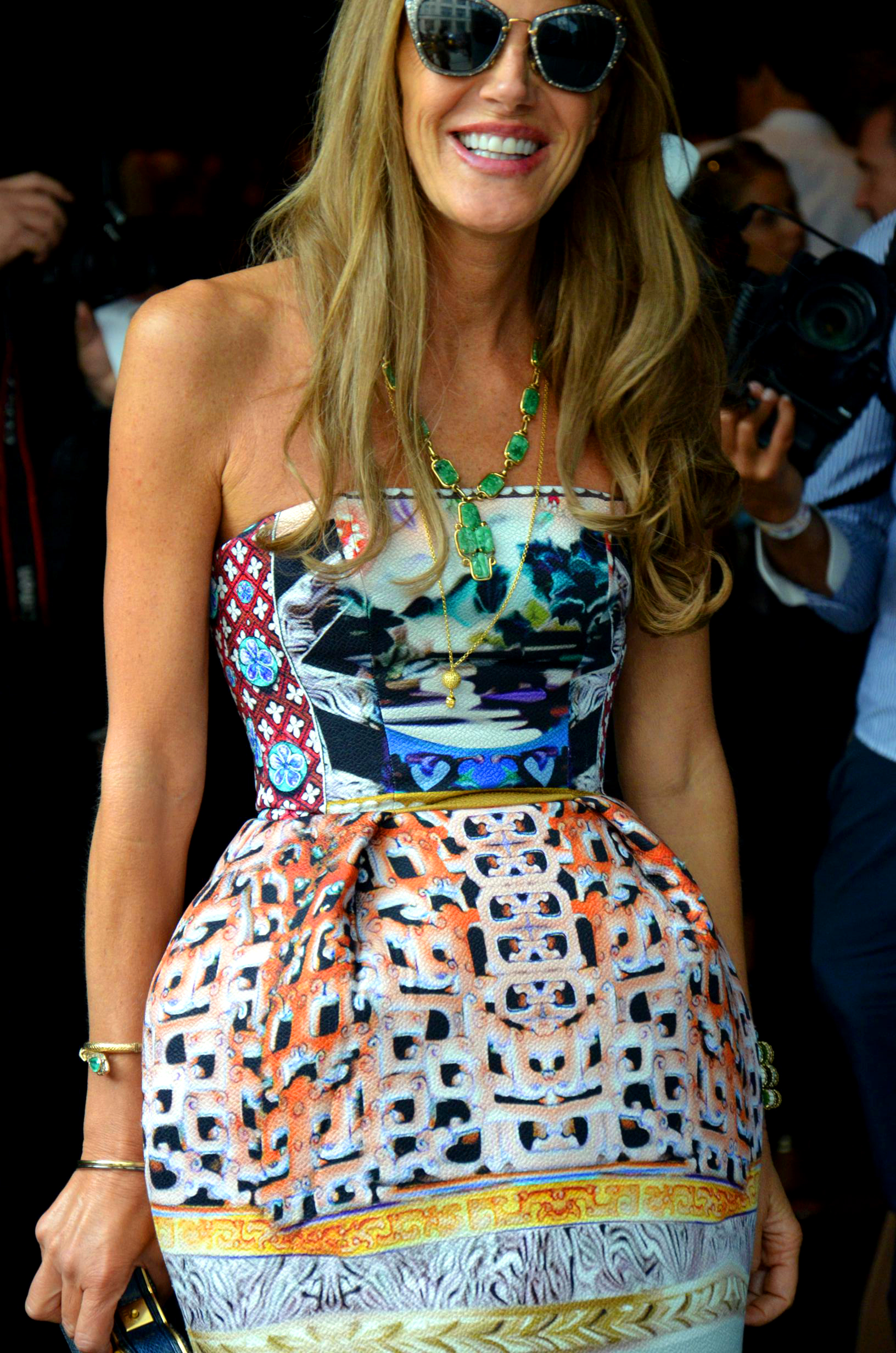
Anna Dello Russo in a Mary Katrantzou dress

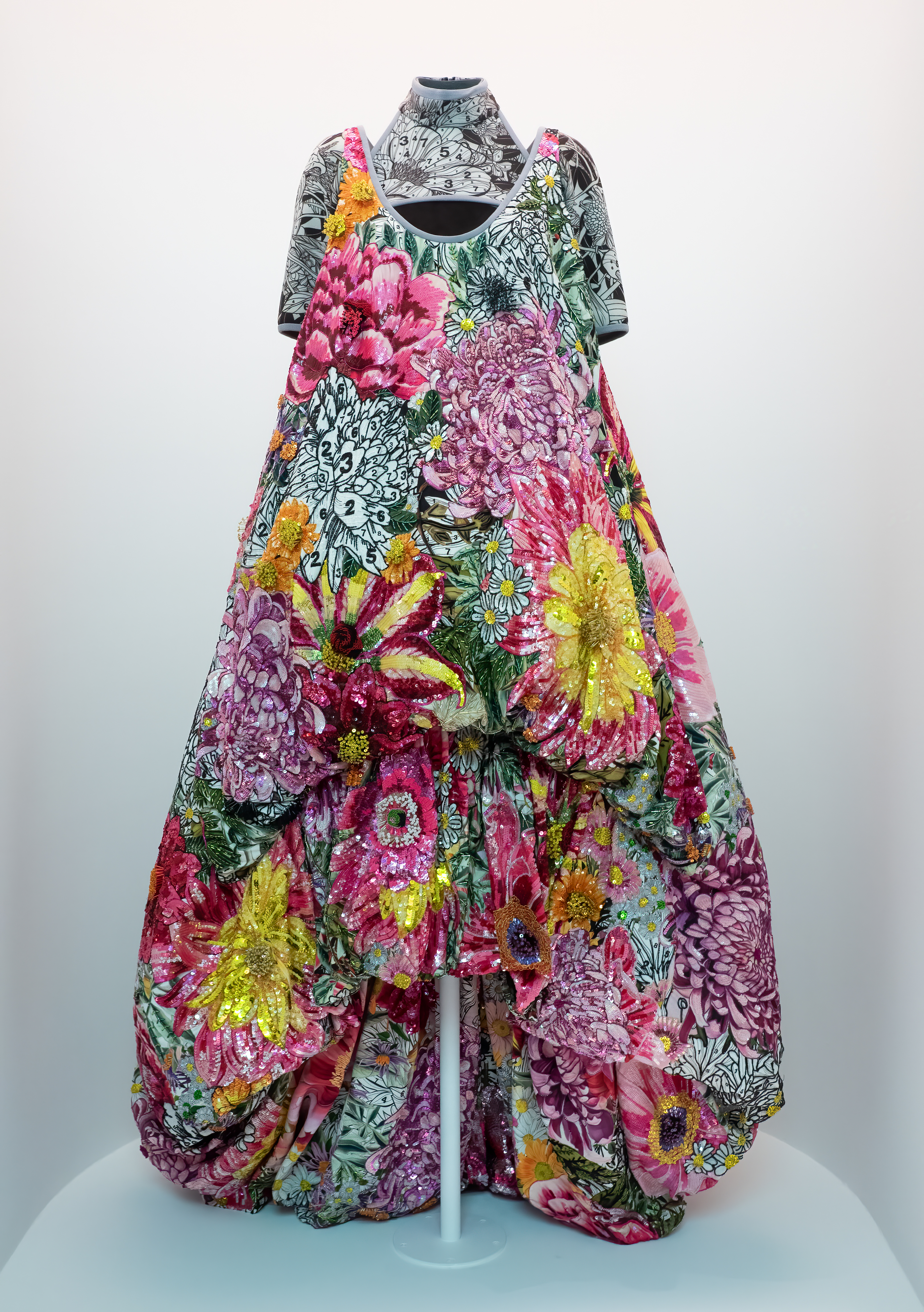
"Digitalis" dress featured in the Sleeping Beauties: Reawakening Fashion exhibition at the Metropolitan Museum of Art

During her studies, she managed to sell some of her prints to Bill Blass. Graduating from her bachelor course in 2005, Katrantzou switched her focus from prints for interiors to fashion prints. Whilst collaborating with Sophia Kokosalaki in 2006, she built up a portfolio for the Central Saint Martins master's fashion textiles course.

In February 2008, Katrantzou opened the Saint Martins MA Fashion show at London Fashion Week. Her collection was nominated for the Harrods and the L‘Oreal Professional Award. Katrantzou's graduating show in 2008 mapped out her signature style. It was themed around trompe l'oeil prints of oversized jewellery featured on jersey-bonded dresses. These pieces created the illusion of wearing giant neckpieces that would be too heavy in reality. She also designed jewellery made out of wood and metal that were exact replicas of the prints.

Katrantzou's first Prêt-à-porter collection was shown at the autumn/winter London Fashion Week in 2008. She was awarded NEWGEN sponsorship from the British Fashion Council for six seasons (S/S 2009 – A/W 2011).

Katrantzou's first ready-to-wear collection for Autumn/Winter 2009 debuted at London Fashion Week in February 2009. Despite a small collection of nine dresses, Katrantzou picked up 15 stockists including Browns, Joyce and Colette. The designer achieved show status the following season, in Autumn/Winter 2009.

Her collections are now sold in over 200 fashion shops, including Selfridges, Harvey Nichols, Barneys, Neiman Marcus, Colette, 10 Corso Como, Joyce, Luisa via roma, Mytheresa, Hiphunters, Stylebop, Opening Ceremony and Net a Porter, and in 47 countries. A collection for Topshop launched for London Fashion Week autumn/winter 2010 and was available in shops in February 2011 and sold out within the first few days of its release. Katrantzou's work has appeared in publications including Vogue, Dazed & Confused, and Grazia. She is one of the designers of Città dell'arte Fashion.

February 2012 saw the release of her collaboration with Longchamp creating a capsule collection of bags and totes. To promote them Vogue Japan gave away a plastic card case with Katrantzou's prints with their May issue. Three prints featured in this collaboration over several different shapes and sizes.

In April 2014, Katrantzou announced she would be working with Adidas 'for the foreseeable future', both clothing and footwear.

Katrantzou sold a minority stake in her business to Yu Capital, the investment division of Hong Kong-based Yu Holdings, in October 2017. The terms of the deal were not disclosed, but it was said to have been part of Yu Holdings' founder and chief executive Wendy Yu's "wider plan to act as bridge for Western brands targeting Chinese consumers."

In 2018, Katrantzou celebrated the label's 10 year anniversary by showcasing her tenth-anniversary collection during September's London Fashion Week. Katrantzou’s show was at The Roundhouse in London, It is her imagination of the ordinary with initial vivid prints which the designer is known for.

At the end of 2019, Katrantzou returned home to Athens, where she showcased the SS20 collection. The show was dedicated to celebrating the 30th anniversary of the founding of ELPIDA, the Association of Friends of Children with Cancer, established by Mrs Marianna V. Vardinoyannis.

In April 2024, Mary Katrantzou became Bulgari's first creative director for leather goods and accessories.

== Awards ==
In 2010, Katrantzou was awarded the Swiss Textiles Award, succeeding Alexander Wang.

In November 2011, Katrantzou was awarded the British Fashion Award for Emerging Talent: womenswear and in February 2012 was awarded Young Designer of the Year at the Elle Style Awards.

She received the 2015 BFC/Vogue Designer Fashion Fund including a 12-month period of mentorship and a £200,000 grant.

In 2015 she was awarded the British Fashion Awards – New Establishment.

== Personal life ==
She is the daughter of Katherine Gouma and Mr Katrantzous. Katrantzous is an only child and has no family of her own.
