= Swarovski Optik =

Austrian manufacturer of optical devices

- Company type: Private
- Industry: Optical engineering
- Founded: 1949
- Headquarters: Absam (Innsbruck-Land District), Austria
- Products: Binoculars, spotting scopes, rifle scopes
- Revenue: ▲€158.7 million euro (2019)
- Number of employees: 1000
- Website: swarovskioptik.com

Swarovski Optik is part of the Swarovski group of companies. Its headquarters are located in Absam, Tyrol, Austria.

== History ==
Wilhelm Swarovski, son of the original founder, was born in 1918. In 1935, with the help of his father, he developed a prism fabrication and grinding process that he used in the design of his first 6×30 binocular. In 1949 he founded SWAROVSKI OPTIK KG in Absam, Tyrol, to produce the Habicht 7×42 that it continues producing today.

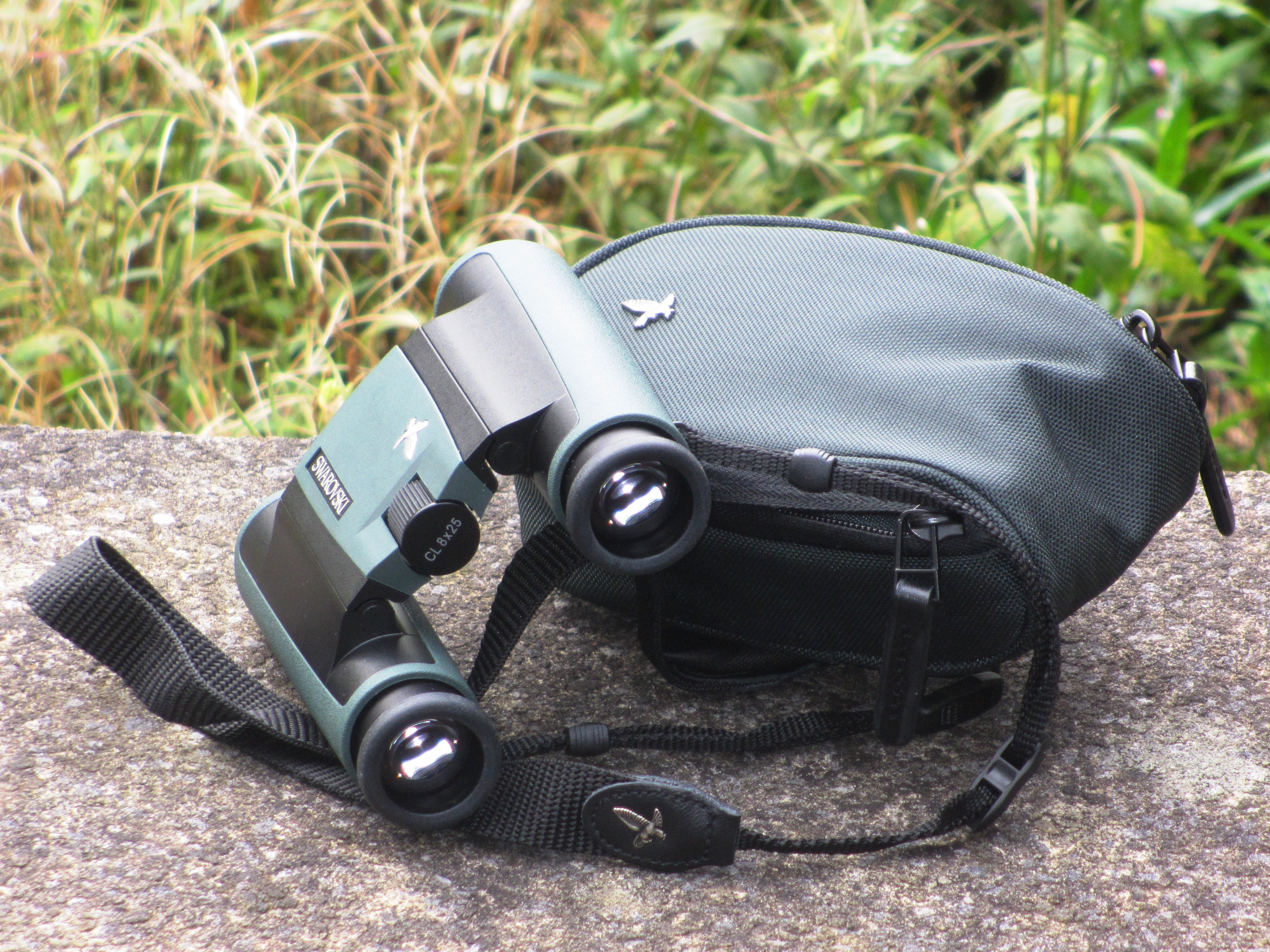
Swarovski CL 8×25 binoculars

- 1935 First Swarovski binoculars, which was a 6×30
- 1949 Formation of Swarovski Optik
- 1959 First Swarovski Optik rifle scope (4×32)
- 1967 First Swarovski Optik extendable spotting scope (30×75)
- 1974 Kahles was purchased by Swarovski Optik
- 1977 Kahles became a branch of Swarovski Optik
- 1989 Kahles Limited again became an independent company within the Swarovski group
- 1991 First AT 80 telescope
- 1993 First hunting rifle scope with reticle illumination
- 1995 First rifle scope with integrated laser range finder
- 1999 First binoculars with wrap-around grip, named EL
- 2007 First Swarovski rifle scope with 6× zoom
- 2016 First Swarovski rifle scope with 8× zoom
- 2017 Kahles was again brought into the Swarovski advertising and sales programs

== Product Range ==
=== Binoculars ===
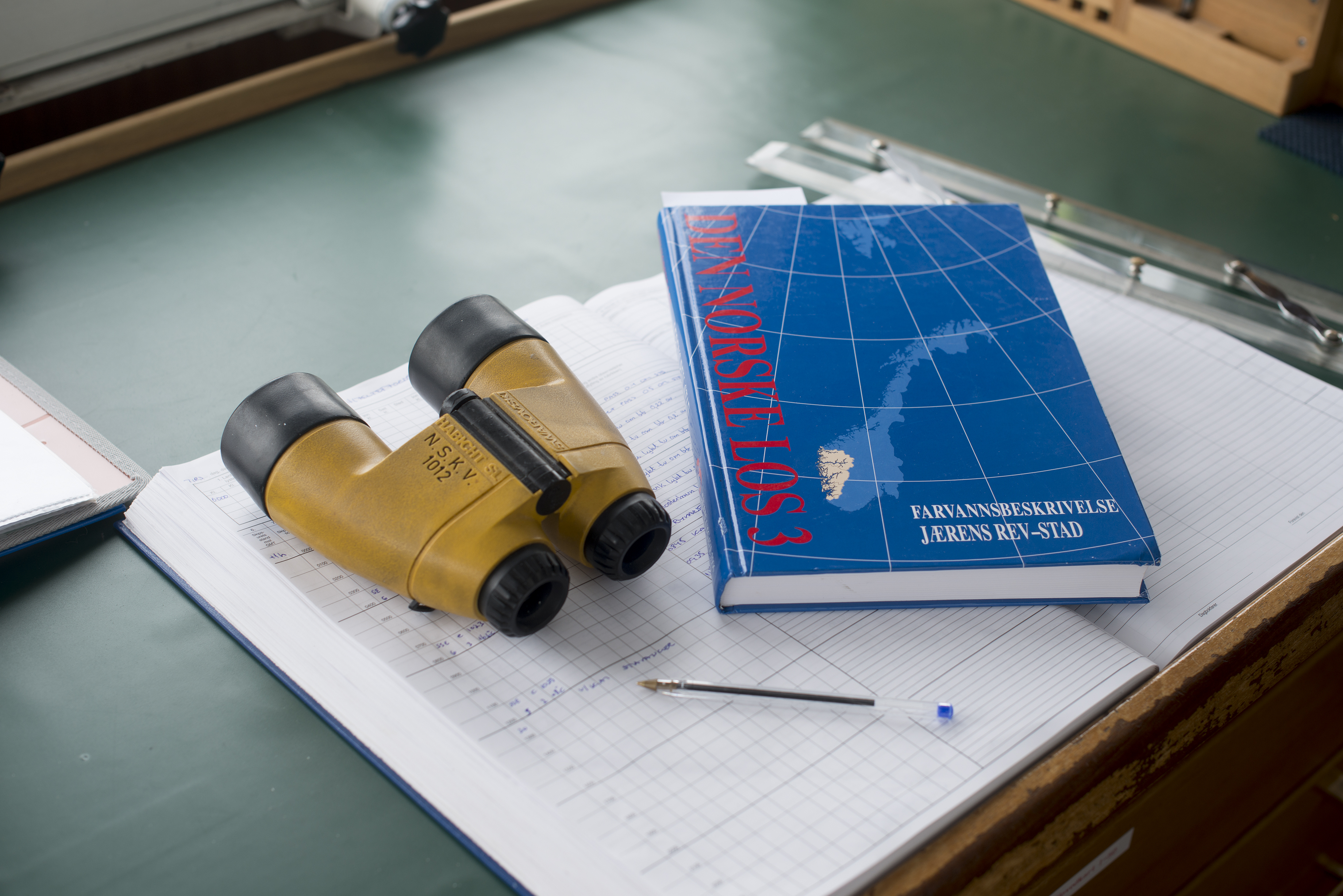
Swarovski Habicht SL Porro prism binoculars

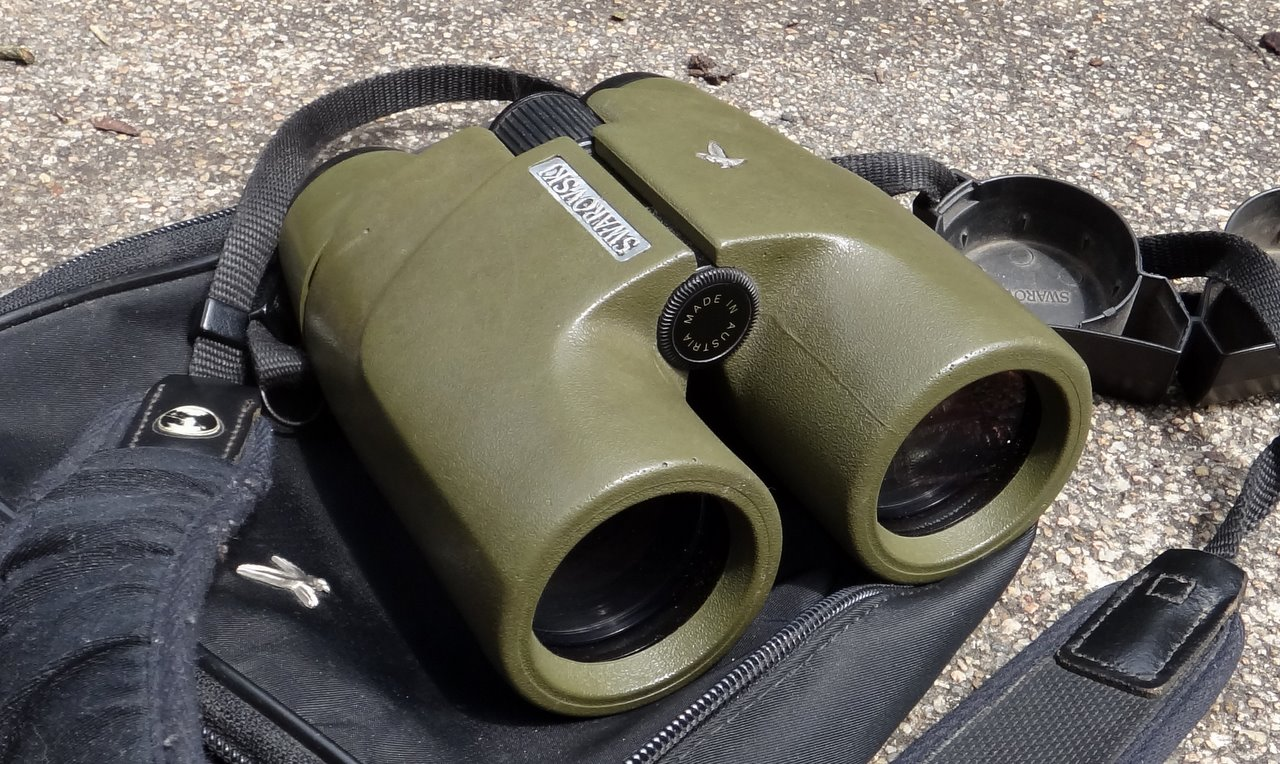
SLC 10x42 WB roof prism binoculars

- Habicht
- CL, includes CL Nomad
- SLC
- EL
- EL Range (green and orange)
- NL Pure
- AX Visio

=== Spotting scopes ===
- CTC, CTS
- ATS, STS
- STR
- ATX, STX
- ATX Interior
- BTX,
- ATC, STC
- ST Vista

=== Rifle scopes ===
- Z3 (American market only)
- Z5 (American market only)
- Z5i
- X5i
- Z6i
- Z8i
- dS
