= Battaglia (surname) =

Battaglia (Italian pronunciation: [batˈtaʎʎa]) is an Italian surname, from the Italian word battaglia, meaning "battle". The personal name, and following surname, emerged from the use of the word as a nickname for a combatant or a combative person. It may have also been a habitational surname for someone who lived at the place of a famous battle, or originated from one of many places in Italy named Battaglia. The surname has been born by several noble families, including in Bologna, Rimini, Venice, Pisa, Sicily, and Trentino.

Notable people with the surname include:

- Adolfo Battaglia (1930–2026), Italian journalist and politician
- Anthony J. Battaglia (born 1949), American jurist
- Aurelius Battaglia (1910–1984), American illustrator
- Bates Battaglia (born 1975), American ice hockey player
- Bryan B. Battaglia (born 1961), American military advisor
- Carlo Battaglia (1933–2005), Italian designer
- Daniele Battaglia (born 1981), Italian singer and television personality
- David Peter Battaglia (1931–2017), American politician
- Dino Battaglia (1923–1983), Italian comic artist
- Domenico Battaglia (1842–1904), Italian painter, mainly of interior vedute
- Domenico Battaglia (cardinal) (born 1963), Italian archbishop of Naples
- Elio Battaglia (1933–2024), Italian baritone and singing teacher
- Francine Battaglia, American aerospace engineer
- Frank Battaglia, the only Italian-American police commissioner of Baltimore
- Giuseppe Battaglia (died 1669), Roman Catholic prelate who served as Bishop of Montemarano
- Faith and Liberty Battaglia, murder victims
- Fern Battaglia (1931–2001), All-American Girls Professional Baseball League
- Frank Battaglia, American police officer and commissioner
- Frank Battaglia (boxer) (1910–1973), Canadian boxer
- Frank "Frankie" Battaglia (1910–1971) Boxer, Olympian
- Francesco Battaglia (footballer), Italian footballer
- Georginna Battaglia Benitez (born 1995), Paraguayan handball player in the Paraguay national team
- Giovanna Battaglia Engelbert (born 1979), Italian fashion editor and Creative Director
- Giovanni Battaglia (1893–1949), Italian racing driver
- Guillermo Battaglia (1899–1988), Argentine film actor
- John Battaglia, murderer
- Jorge Battaglia (born 1960), Paraguayan football goalkeeper
- Juan Manuel Battaglia (born 1957), Paraguayan football midfielder
- Kaci Battaglia (born 1987), American singer
- Karen Battaglia, American politician
- Letizia Battaglia (1935–2022), Italian photographer, journalist and editor
- Lynne A. Battaglia, American lawyer and jurist
- Marco Battaglia (born 1973), National Football League player
- Matt Battaglia (born 1965), American actor and producer
- Miguel Battaglia, Italian-Brazilian tailor and football chairman
- Mike Battaglia, American horse racing analyst
- Rik Battaglia (1927–2015), Italian actor
- Roberto Battaglia (1909–1965), Italian fencer
- Rodrigo Battaglia (born 1991), Argentine football midfielder
- Ryan Battaglia (born 1992), Australian baseball player
- Salvatore Battaglia (born 1975), Italian boxer
- Sam Battaglia (1908–1973), American mobster
- Sara Battaglia (born 1994), Italian fashion designer and the founder of the Sara Battaglia fashion label
- Sebastián Battaglia (born 1980), Argentine professional footballer
- Skip Battaglia, American filmmaker and animator
- Stefano Battaglia (born 1965), Italian classical and jazz pianist

== See also ==
- Battaglini, a related surname
