= Battaglin =

Battaglin is a surname. Notable people with the surname include:

- Enrico Battaglin (born 1989), Italian cyclist
- Giovanni Battaglin (born 1951), Italian cyclist

== See also ==
- Battaglia (surname)
- Battaglini
