= Marina Raphael =

Fashion designer

- Marina Raphael in 2024
- Born: Marina Rafail-Vogiatzakis; 1998 (age 27–28); Athens, Greece
- Education: St. Catherine's British School; King's College London
- Occupation: Handbag designer
- Years active: 2018 to present
- Relatives: Daniel Swarovski, Victoria Swarovski
- Website: https://marinaraphael.com/

Marina Raphael (born Marina Rafail-Vogiatzakis in 1998) is a handbag designer and sixth-generation member of the Swarovski family. She is the founder and creative director of her eponymous handbag brand, Marina Raphael, has designed handbag collections for Swarovski, and is Artistic and Design Director of Handbags at fashion house Elie Saab. In 2022, she was included in Forbes Europe's 30 Under 30 list in its Arts & Culture category. The same year, she was included in Fortune Greece's 40 Under 40 list.

== Early life and education ==
Raphael was born and raised in Athens. Her father is Greek and her mother is Swiss-Austrian. Through her mother's family, she is a sixth-generation descendant of Swarovski founder Daniel Swarovski. She graduated with an International Baccalaureate from St. Catherine's British School before completing a bachelor's degree in Business Management at King's College London.

== Career ==
At the age of 19, Raphael founded her eponymous handbag label Marina Raphael, launching it a year later in 2018 while studying at university.

In 2024, at the age of 26, Raphael was appointed Artistic and Design Director of Handbags at fashion house Elie Saab, the first time the house had created a dedicated creative leadership role for the category. In this role, she works alongside the house's founder and creative director, Elie Saab. Raphael is responsible for designing four ready-to-wear handbag collections and two haute couture handbag collections annually. Her first designs debuted during the house's January 2025 Haute Couture show.

== Marina Raphael brand ==
In 2018, Raphael launched her eponymous handbag brand, Marina Raphael, while studying at university. She serves as the brand's designer and CEO. Its handbags are manufactured in Florence, Italy, with quality control outsourced to Swarovski in Austria.

The brand has collaborated with designers and companies including Swarovski, Giovanna Battaglia Engelbert, and Doina Ciobanu. Its handbags have been stocked by international luxury retailers and carried by celebrities and public figures.
