= Battaglia =

Battaglia (Italian for Battle) may refer to:

== Places of Italy ==
Municipalities

- Battaglia Terme, in the Province of Padua, Veneto
- Montebello della Battaglia, in the Province of Pavia, Lombardy
- Moriago della Battaglia, in the Province of Treviso, Veneto
- Nervesa della Battaglia, in the Province of Treviso, Veneto
- San Fermo della Battaglia, in the Province of Como, Lombardy
- Sernaglia della Battaglia, in the Province of Treviso, Veneto

Civil parishes

- Battaglia (Casaletto Spartano), in the municipality of Casaletto Spartano (SA), Campania
- San Martino della Battaglia, in the municipality of Desenzano del Garda (BS), Lombardy

== Other uses ==
- Battaglia (surname)
- Battaglia (genera), a prehistoric sponge
- Battaglia (music), an Italian musical term used in English
- La battaglia di Legnano, an opera of Giuseppe Verdi
- Battaglia pie
