= Domenico Battaglia =

Domenico Battaglia may refer to:

- Domenico Battaglia (painter) (1842–1904), Italian painter
- Domenico Battaglia (cardinal) (born 1963), Italian Catholic prelate
