= Marina Raphael (brand) =

Handbag brand

- Industry: Fashion
- Founded: 2018
- Founder: Marina Raphael
- Products: Handbags
- Website: marinaraphael.com

Marina Raphael is a handbag brand founded by fashion designer Marina Raphael and launched in 2018. The brand has collaborated with Swarovski, influencers, and other designers on handbag collections.

== Production and distribution ==
The brand's founder, Marina Raphael, serves as its designer and CEO. Its handbags are produced in Florence, Italy, with quality control outsourced to Swarovski in Austria. Its handbags have been stocked by Harrods, Harvey Nichols, LuisaViaRoma, Neiman Marcus, Moda Operandi, and El Corte Inglés.

The brand's handbags have been carried by Queen Máxima of the Netherlands, Jessica Alba, Paris Hilton, Katie Holmes, Jennifer Lopez, Emma Roberts, and Alicia Keys.

== Collaborations ==
Since 2020, the brand has collaborated with a number of designers and companies. These have included L'Oréal's Vichy Laboratories, for which Raphael also served as the face of its Greek advertising campaigns, influencer Evangelie Smyrniotaki, and stylist Georgia Medley. A collaboration with creative director and sustainability consultant Doina Ciobanu resulted in the brand's first sustainable handbag collection, using a form of vegan leather made as a by-product of industrial apple processing.

Raphael has also collaborated extensively with Swarovski. A collaboration announced in 2020 with Swarovski Group Global Creative Director Giovanna Battaglia Engelbert led to the first handbag line released under the Swarovski marque in the jeweller's 125-year history. A second collaboration followed in 2024, when Swarovski Creators Lab and Marina Raphael released a limited-edition Valentine's Day capsule collection of crystal-embellished handbags.

In 2022, the brand collaborated with fine jewellery designer Eugenie Niarchos on a series of bespoke handbags accompanied by a collection of non-fungible tokens.
