= Stronger (Kanye West song) =

2007 single by Kanye West

Single by Kanye West

from the album Graduation
- B-side: "Can't Tell Me Nothing"
- Released: July 31, 2007
- Recorded: 2006–2007
- Studio: Ape Sounds (Tokyo); Sony Music (New York City); The Record Plant (Hollywood)
- Genre: Hip-hop; electronica
- Length: 5:15 (album version); 4:08 (radio edit); 4:27 (video version)
- Label: Roc-A-Fella; Def Jam
- Songwriters: Kanye West; Mike Dean; Thomas Bangalter; Guy-Manuel de Homem-Christo; Edwin Birdsong
- Producer: Kanye West

Kanye West singles chronology
"Can't Tell Me Nothing" (2007)	"Stronger" (2007)	"Good Life" (2007)

Music video
- "Stronger" on YouTube

"Stronger" is a song by American rapper Kanye West from his third studio album, Graduation (2007). The song was written and produced by West, with an extended outro handled by Mike Dean. Daft Punk were credited as co-writers due to their work being sampled; West decided to sample "Harder, Better, Faster, Stronger" after first hearing the duo's work when touring in 2006, then made the beat and spent months re-writing his verses; Daft Punk voiced their approval of the song, finding West made the sample suitable for his personality as he ventured outside of hip-hop. Edwin Birdsong also received a credit for a master use of "Cola Bottle Baby". After West published a snippet in May 2007, as part of the promotional mixtape Can't Tell Me Nothing (2007), "Stronger" was released to US rhythmic contemporary radio stations as the second single from the album on July 31, 2007, through Roc-A-Fella Records and Def Jam Recordings.

A maximalist hip-hop song also based in electronica and described by West as an emancipation from his previous mistakes, the song addresses the theme of self-empowerment. The lyrics present someone who finds that his patience strengthens him when he is lustful for a girl on the chorus, paraphrasing Nietzsche's aphorism.

dictum: "What does not kill him, makes him stronger." The song received generally positive reviews from music critics, who mostly highlighted the sample of "Harder, Better, Faster, Stronger". Focus was placed on West's innovation through the combination of electronica and hip-hop, while critical assessments of his rapping were somewhat mixed.

"Stronger" was named to year-end lists for 2007 by multiple publications, including Spin and The Village Voice. The song was awarded Best Rap Solo Performance at the 50th Grammy Awards, alongside winning Best Rap/Hip Hop Dance Track at the 2008 International Dance Music Awards. Later appearing on retrospective lists of numerous outlets, it was ranked number 493 on Rolling Stone's 500 Greatest Songs of All Time in 2024. The song topped the US Billboard Hot 100, becoming West's third number-one single in the United States and ranking as his third biggest hit of all time there as of 2018. The top spot was also achieved in Canada, New Zealand, Turkey, and the United Kingdom, while it reached the top 10 of six other countries and the European Hot 100 Singles chart. The song became West's first single to receive a diamond certification in the US from the Recording Industry Association of America (RIAA) in 2021, five years before being certified fourteen-times platinum by the RIAA. It was also awarded octuple and triple platinum certifications in Australia and the UK by the Australian Recording Industry Association and British Phonographic Industry, respectively.

The accompanying music video, inspired by anime film Akira (1988), juxtaposed shots of Tokyo with West rapping, and won Best Hip-Hop Video at the 2007 BET Hip Hop Awards. West performed "Stronger" live on his Glow in the Dark Tour (2007–08), with Daft Punk at the Grammys, and at several festivals, including Wireless and Glastonbury. The song has been featured in several pieces of media, such as the film The Hangover Part II (2011) and the series Girls. Retrospectively, the song has been credited for influencing hip-hop artists to move towards electronica elements and also the revival of disco-infused music in the late 2000s.

== Background and development ==
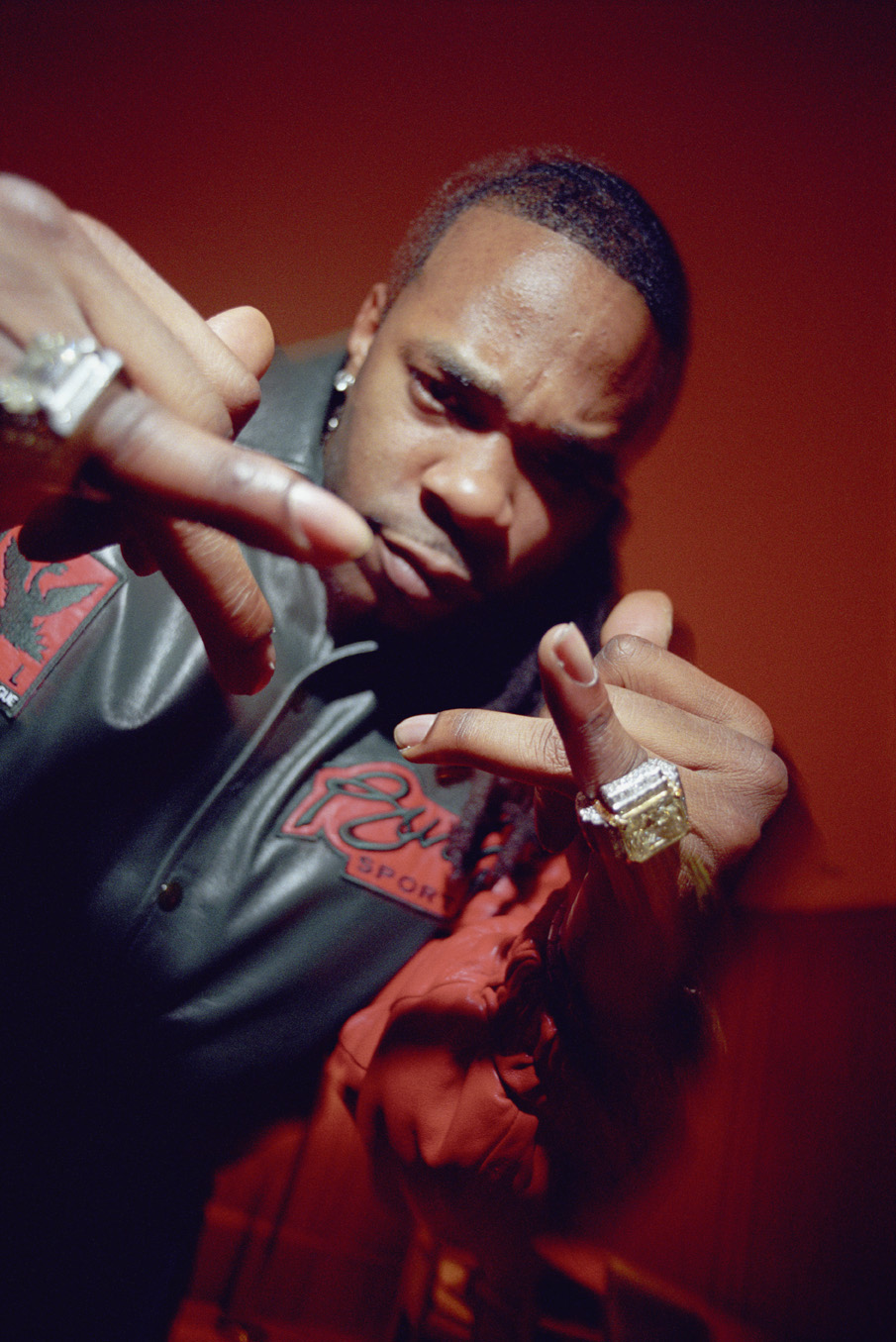
The song's sample of Daft Punk's material was not the first time a rap act had sampled them, after Busta Rhymes had done so on his 2005 single "Touch It". West listened to the single on a tour bus in 2006, which was how he first discovered the duo.

"Stronger" was conceived as a challenge to compete with producer Timbaland and singer Justin Timberlake, as West's fiancée at the time was a huge fan of their 2006 hit single "SexyBack", to his chagrin. West was struggling to produce the drums on the record and initially went to producers Pharrell Williams and Swizz Beatz for assistance, but the song was not sounding the way he intended. Before its release, West first shared a snippet of "Stronger" on his mixtape Can't Tell Me Nothing in May 2007. The song was playlisted by BBC Radio 1, appearing on DJ Tim Westwood's "Top Five Heavy Hits" for July 31, 2007. The song's cover art was released through West's website with a video teaser on June 29, 2007. It was designed by Japanese artist Takashi Murakami, who handled the artwork of singles and the creative direction for Graduation. The cover artwork features a cartoon version of West's mascot "Dropout Bear", wearing the rapper's white sunglasses.

"Stronger" musically derives from a vocal sample of "Harder, Better, Faster, Stronger" (2001) by French house duo Daft Punk. The sample was requested by West through Pedro Winter, Daft Punk's manager at the time. The duo, who enjoyed the track, granted approval and were open-minded towards producing for rappers after the sample increased their popularity in hip hop; they found the genre "exciting and interesting". In June 2007, West acknowledged that he was not the first rap producer to sample Daft Punk, as Swizz Beatz had sampled their single "Technologic" for rapper Busta Rhymes' 2005 track "Touch It". West later met the Daft Punk musicians, Thomas Bangalter and Guy-Manuel de Homem-Christo, at Chicago music festival Lollapalooza in 2007. West was convinced "Stronger" was inferior to "Harder, Better, Faster, Stronger" when he heard it after release, although Daft Punk disagreed and were delighted with how the song turned out. The two first heard it on Power 106 when awaiting a San Francisco flight; Homem-Christo recalled that the DJ transitioned from their original into the song and expressed how West's sound "was really fat". He clarified that they may not have collaborated in the studio, but the original's vibe separately connected with West's work.

Speaking on Tim Westwood TV in 2007, West said that his label executives were skeptical of "Stronger" since they thought people would not understand its sample, which he used to cross creative boundaries. For a Spin story with West and Bangalter in January 2008, the rapper stated that he had accomplished a new level of musicality with how the song was crafted, particularly the end, and described his previous shortcomings at reaching this level as "still way better than everything else in hip-hop". Bangalter was intrigued by West making the sample suitable for his own personality, noticing how the rapper distorts its meaning like Daft Punk's musical attempts to express their ideas universally. He also said that the combination of genres for "Stronger" was done at a time of "open-mindedness on the part of both the musicians and the audiences", while West recalled receiving criticism from the electronic community for sampling a "holy grail" and the hip hop community for venturing outside his genre. West said that hip hop is about innovation and crafting previously unheard combinations. Bangalter echoed his views on influence; he explained that "what you want is the next generation to destroy what you've done" and start over again, emphasising the importance of taking risks when famous. He also would not comment about a future collaboration with West, though Daft Punk later contributed production to his sixth album Yeezus in 2013, including its lead single "Black Skinhead".

On annotations for Genius in 2015, Canadian DJ A-Trak detailed the origins of the sample. A-Trak and West heard the sample of "Technologic" in Busta Rhymes' "Touch It" on a tour bus during 2006; the rapper was a fan of the beat, but did not know who Daft Punk were at the time. The two went to a hotel and the DJ played "Harder, Better, Faster, Stronger" to West, who was insistent on sampling the track after taking a liking. A-Trak felt reluctant because of a 1990s "mentality in terms of sampling" for using unknown records, although retrospectively believed West's choice was correct and that culture had accelerated musically. West sent him an early demo of "Stronger" as they were on tour and A-Trak appreciated the sample, after which West made the beat and re-wrote his verses for months. The DJ ultimately contributed scratching to the song, decided by West since "it's only right". A-Trak later spoke about the sample at the Meadows Music & Arts Festival 2017 in New York City (NYC), crediting West's "curiosity period" when genres were largely separated and focusing on his strength at "identifying these [great] things". The DJ also recapped his initial reluctance as he offered that "Harder, Better, Faster, Stronger" remained "an international hit" despite West not having heard of Daft Punk, feeling the usage could come across as cheap.

== Writing and recording ==
"Stronger" paraphrases a dictum from German philosopher Friedrich Nietzsche, whose content is related by West to the more physical subject of a girl. West was particularly proud of his comparison between her and actress Apollonia Kotero, honoring how the reference stood out for its purity as opposed to rappers using "prefabricated metaphors and similes" about subjects from guns to sports. The track's production was handled by West and utilizes a vocal sample of "Harder, Better, Faster, Stronger" by Daft Punk, the instrumental of which samples "Cola Bottle Baby" (1979), a song by the funk keyboardist Edwin Birdsong. Bangalter and Homem-Christo were credited as co-writers of "Stronger" because of the vocal sample, while Birdsong received a writing credit due to the master use of "Cola Bottle Baby". West sought to give his sample a cinematic sound and he slowed it down, loosening the rhythm and overdubbing throbbing synths. The rapper and record producer Mike Dean, who handled the outro, layered and re-arranged the sample to create their crescendos. West accompanied it with his rapping and singing, which transformed "a robotic feel into something much more soulful".

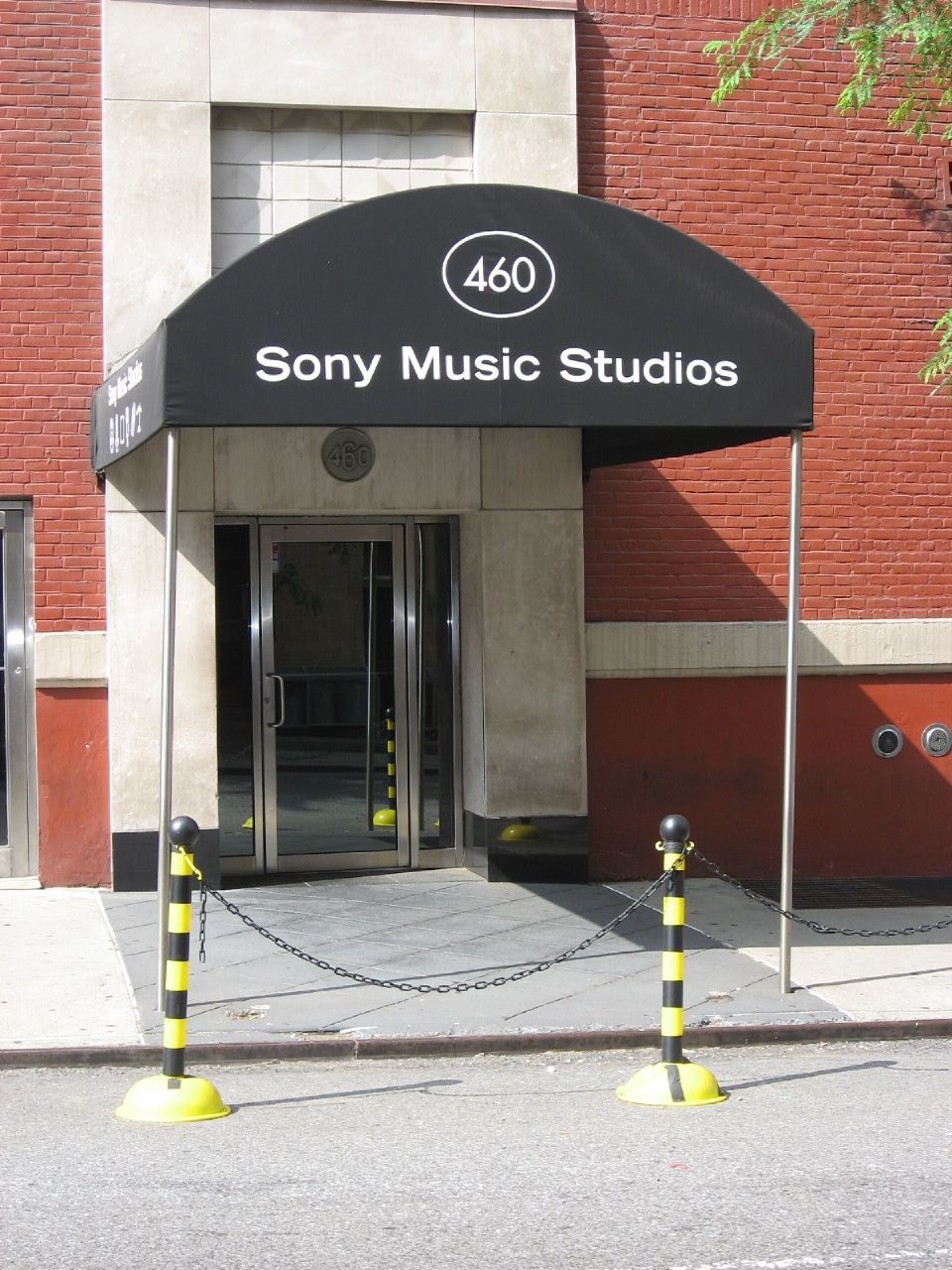
Sony Music Studios in New York City, one of the locations for the song's recording sessions.

The song was recorded at Ape Sounds in Tokyo, Sony Music Studios in NYC, and the Record Plant in Hollywood, California. Its recording sessions placed attention to detail and were a turning point in the production process for Graduation, following West having previously been "aimlessly making songs". Video director Hype Williams inspired West to move towards a futuristic direction after he heard the song when it had no drums, which the rapper also did for the music video and the album: "It inspired a whole movement." He returned to the studio to resume working on songs like "Stronger", finding creative inspiration from films such as Total Recall (1990). West reflected on his past mistakes, admitting he had become caught up in criticism and negativity; he channeled his frustration into the song's first verse for expression. He elaborated that rather than an apology, he used the song as "an emancipation". The rapper also said that he offered the message to his fans of him "coming back after a time away and I need you right now", looking for their help in his comeback. Inspired by his worldwide stadium tour with Irish rock band U2 from 2005 to 2006, West redesigned the song for it to be chanted. He said that the song offered the "bigger sound" of stadium music, providing "a throw-your- hands-up-in-the-sky vibe". West explained the song has a "heavy melody", and that it features a digital hi-hat as opposed to a snare drum. West worked on "Stronger" with 8 audio engineers and 11 mix engineers at Larrabee North Studios in Universal City, California and Battery Studios in NYC, recording over 50 versions of the track.

The final version of the song was mixed by Manny Marroquin, who worked with West on several sessions. Marroquin and West got past the challenge of mixing the song through strong communication, beginning with a 14-hour working day at Larrabee and then completing four three-hour sessions at Battery. The producer contributed at Battery in his spare time from working with Alicia Keys; he adjusted the arrangements and the instrumentation with West, who frequently looked for new elements to incorporate. Marroquin worked using stereo submixes and stems on his laptop at the studios, printing mixes with the analogue effects and editing on software like Pro Tools. Due to West's slowing of the song and chopping of the sample, it created glitches that were fixed by him adding volume drops for a few milliseconds each time. Marroquin used equalization and a doubler plug-in to widely pan the dominant sample across the stereo field, thus ensuring West's vocals could be heard over it.

West mixed "Stronger" 75 times, with over 100 elements including many layers and he was dedicated to working with Marroquin on the kick drums sounding precise, seeking out a sound for the clubs. Marroquin broke the drum down into an 808, snare drum, and hi-hat, then working on the sample, keyboards, and vocals; West heard the final version from Larrabee and exclaimed "That's it!" However, he still felt dissatisfied after hearing the song's drums back-to-back with record producer Timbaland's 2007 single "The Way I Are" at a nightclub, deciding to enlist the producer to assist him in redoing the song's drum programming. Despite being perplexed that West was not already satisfied with the song, Timbaland still helped with the programming as they went through 12 iterations. The completed version of "Stronger" contains a master use of Birdsong's "Cola Bottle Baby".

== Composition and lyrics ==
"Stronger"
A 25-second sample of the chorus to "Stronger", deploying the synths, kick drums, and robotic sounds alongside its slowed and chopped vocal sample of Daft Punk's "Harder, Better, Faster, Stronger" on vocoder. West raps about becoming stronger from his patience in lust for a girl as he juxtaposes certain lyrics with the duo's vocals, then delivers his return message to his fans.

Musically, "Stronger" is a maximalist hip-hop song that lasts for a duration of five minutes and eleven seconds (5:11). The composition is also based in electronica and incorporates elements from a range of electronic music genres, including techno, disco, French electronic music, and EDM. According to the sheet music published at Musicnotes.com, "Stronger" is composed in the key of E-flat minor (E♭m) and set in the time signature of common time, with a moderate tempo of 104 beats per minute. The song follows a descending sequence of E♭m–D♭–A♭_{7}–C♭–B♭ as its chord progression. A 4/4 beat pattern is deployed on the song, driven by the bright synths. It is based on a vocoder-affected, slowed vocal sample of Daft Punk's "Harder, Better, Faster, Stronger", which is chopped up.

The song features a bass that accompanies the kick drums as programmed by Timbaland, consisting of an 808, a snare, and a hi-hat. The thumping beat also incorporates robotic sounds, accompanied by West's crescendos and evocative rapping. It starts with a melodic chorus, coupled with the sample. At its close, the track enters an extended outro from Dean that follows his crescendo. The outro features keyboard stabs from Dean, which La Mar "Mars" Edwards and Andy Chatterley also contributed to. These keyboards were added using synths such as Roland Juno-106 and Clavia's Nord Lead, accompanied by Dean's guitars that chime in unison. A-Trak also delivers a four-bar solo of scratches, which is barely audible.

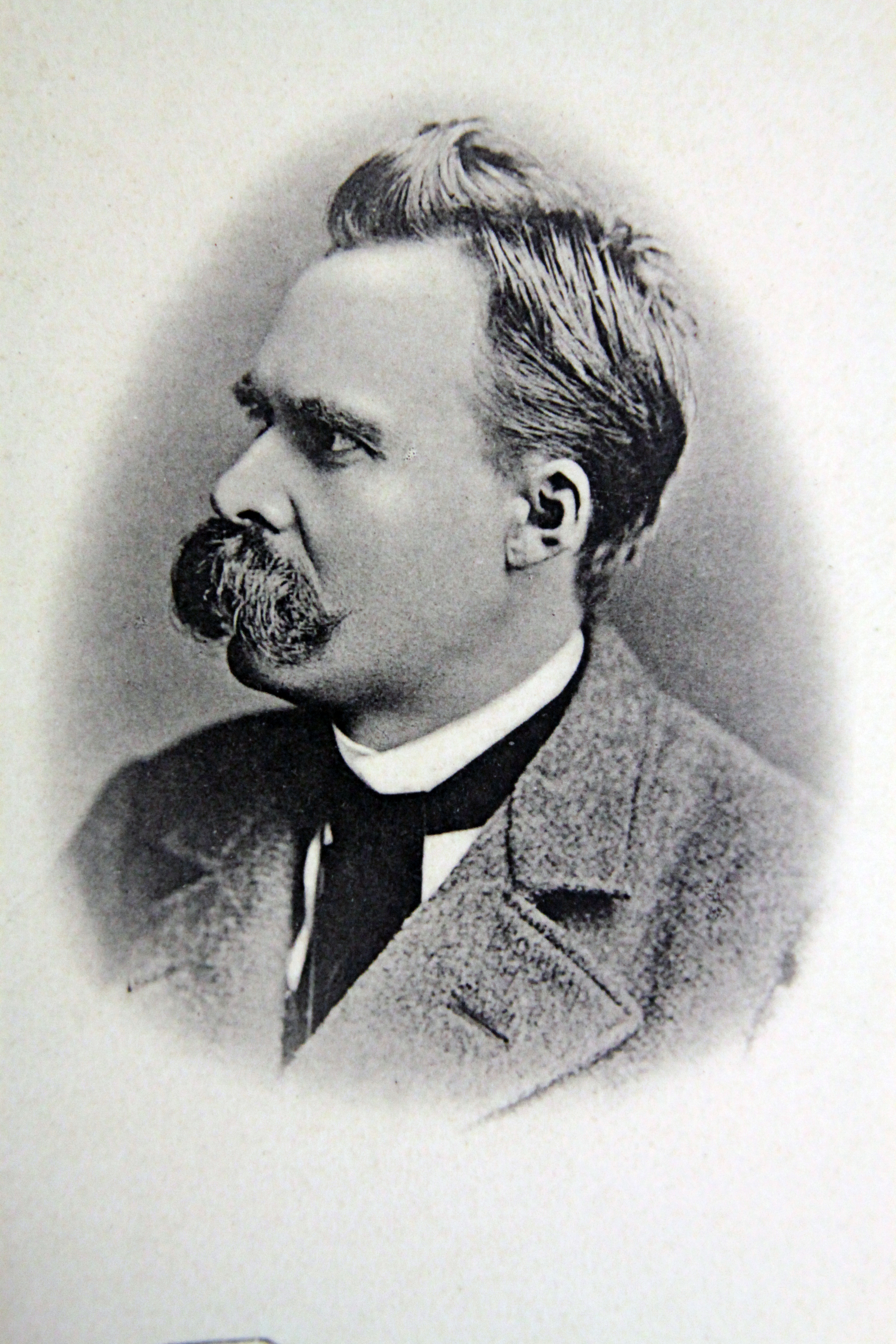
The lyrics of the song's refrain offer a mantra that paraphrases Friedrich Nietzsche's famous quote: "What does not kill him, makes him stronger."

In the lyrics of "Stronger", West focuses on self-empowerment as he asserts his greatness in response to his critics. West raps about his patience making him stronger when struggling with lust for a girl on the chorus, offering a mantra that paraphrases Nietzsche's famous dictum: "What does not kill him, makes him stronger." In addition, West sends a return message to his fans with a refrain of "I need you right now", which also references wanting a girl in the club. West fantasizes the girl as a model, inviting her to be his "black Kate Moss". He juxtaposes the sample's words with his lyrics, preceding Daft Punk's "harder" by telling his girl, "Baby, you’re making it!" The rapper also alludes to Nietzsche's "Apollonian and Dionysian", expressing that he had been seeking out the girl since Prince was involved with Kotero.

== Release and reception ==
On July 31, 2007, "Stronger" was sent to US rhythmic contemporary radio stations as the album's second single by West's labels Roc-A-Fella and Def Jam. The song was made available for digital download in the United Kingdom by the labels on August 3, 10 days before a CD version was issued across Europe by Mercury. It was later released as a CD single in various countries worldwide by West's labels on August 20, 2007. On September 11, 2007, "Stronger" was included as the third track on West's third studio album Graduation.

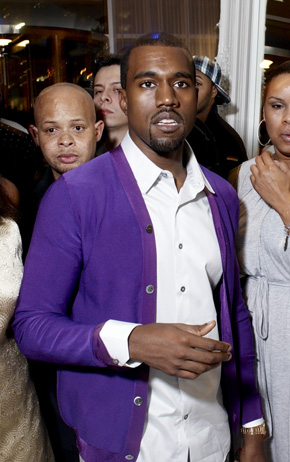
Several reviewers highlighted West's move towards a newer sound with the song, while reception of his rapping was more mixed.

"Stronger" was met with generally positive reviews from music critics, who mostly praised the sample of "Harder, Better, Faster, Stronger". The staff of Rolling Stone assured that West "struck gold" due to the sample and also complimented his lyricism. Writing for The Washington Post, J. Freedom du Lac said that he ventures into his self-aggrandizement on "the arena-rap standout", backed by "booming cyborg beats" and the sample as he commands the crowd with his greatness. At Slant Magazine, Eric Henderson affirmed that West manages to "cut through the hazard tape" with the sample, marking one of the album's "galvanizing moments" in contrast to the soul sampling of West's earlier singles "Through the Wire" (2003) and "Touch the Sky" (2006). The staff of NME wrote that West ventured from his previous choices with the unpredictable liberal sample, putting forward the song as "a contender". Fraser McAlpine of BBC Music graded the song four out of five stars and believed West largely delivered a message to his critics as an artist using "the royal 'we'", elaborating that he is backed by both God and the Daft Punk robots so should be left completely alone and advised to not "pick on him again". The Village Voice critic Greg Tate asserted that the sample seemingly revives Eurodisco, while Spin journalist Charles Aaron and Nathan Rabin of The A.V. Club complimented its techno style. For the Chicago Tribune, Greg Kot saw the song as driven by the sample's synthesizers and Timbaland's drum programming. AllMusic's Andy Kellman declared that the bright synths may be "one of the most glaring deal-breakers in hip-hop history"; Nathan Brackett of Rolling Stone similarly felt West "single-handedly" returns to hip hop's disco days before the 1980s group Run-DMC. In Stylus Magazine, Jayson Greene lauded West for pushing hip hop's sonic boundaries with the sample and the "forlorn guitars chiming in unison" at the end, yet he found certain lyrics to show impatience.

"Stronger" also received mixed reviews from some critics. The Guardian's Dorian Lynskey was impressed with the sample that could be the album's "mission statement" and showcased West's work ethic, but considered rhyming "Klondike" with "blond dyke" to be cringeworthy. Ann Powers from the Los Angeles Times highlighted West's performance by describing him as "push[ing] himself like a runner on a treadmill" who borders on losing his breath and makes the lyrics sound more interesting, despite thinking some of them delve into "embarrassing self-worship". Louis Pattison of NME praised the song as "a silicone-hearted vocoder serenade, beefed up with hoover-like synthesisers", although he felt it resembles an act attempting karaoke without the words rather than pushing new boundaries and saw the sample as unoriginal. For Cokemachineglow, Chet Betz said the song works off the production that could have had a lot more impact due to "the glissando chop 'n key melds dazzling but suffering from a distinct lack of knock" and not even Timbaland can redeem it, while he felt West's lyrics were aimed at oppressing the rest of humanity as he "builds his castle". Anna Pickard of The Guardian became bored of the song quickly due to the sexual nature, although she praised the sample for opening with an "immediate familiarity" that is an appropriate fit for "this thumping beat".

== Accolades ==
"Stronger" appeared on numerous year-end lists of multiple publications for 2007. The track was crowned as the best record of the year by Spin, while MTV named it the sixth best song. The song was voted seventh on the yearly Pazz & Jop poll of The Village Voice, receiving 48 mentions. On a poll taken by Eye Weekly of critics across Canada for 2007, it was ranked at the same position, scoring 550 points in a tied seventh place. Rolling Stone named it as the 11th best song the 2007; the staff were impressed with West shifting towards robot funk and French electronic music on the "futuristic, Daft Punk-fueled synthfest".

For the 2014 issue of XXL that was in celebration of 40 years of hip hop, the magazine selected the track as one of the five best singles of 2007. On a list of the top 50 songs from the 2000s decade by Consequence, "Stronger" was listed at number 21. In Rolling Stone's decade-end readers' poll, the song was voted as the sixth best single of the 2000s. Furthermore, a 2013 Rolling Stone reader's poll ranked "Stronger" as West's eighth best song to that point. In 2012, "Stronger" was listed by Complex as West's ninth best song and The Daily Telegraph's Neil McCormick placed the track fifth in 2015, while it was placed at number eight on a list compiled for his 39th birthday by the Jamaica Observer on June 8, 2016. The song was named by CraveOnline as West's sixth best song a year later, whereas Highsnobiety ranked it as West's ninth best song in 2020. In 2024, "Stronger" was listed at number 493 on Rolling Stone's 500 Greatest Songs of All Time; the staff wrote that West's stadium music influence from U2 and the Rolling Stones is channeled by the sample of "Harder, Better, Faster, Stronger".

The track received a total of eight nominations for industry awards. At the 2008 ASCAP Pop Music Awards, "Stronger" was awarded as one of the Most Performed Songs. It was among the Award Winning Songs at the Broadcast Music, Inc. (BMI) London Awards, Pop Awards, and R&B/Hip-Hop Awards in 2008. The track won Best Rap Solo Performance at the 50th Annual Grammy Awards, beating "I Get Money" by West's rival and fellow rapper 50 Cent.

Year-end lists for "Stronger"
Publication	Accolade	Rank	Ref.
Blitz	The Best Songs of 2007	9	
Consequence	Top 50 Songs of 2007	17	
Eye Weekly	The Best Singles of 2007	7	
The Guardian	The Best Singles of 2007	12	
MTV	The Best Songs of 2007	6	
PopMatters	The Best Singles of 2007	19	
Rolling Stone	The 100 Best Songs of 2007	11	
Spin	Top Songs of 2007	1	
Thought Catalog	Top 100 Pop Songs of 2007	11	
Triple J	Hottest 100 of 2007	20	
The Village Voice	The Pazz & Jop Music Critics Poll 2007	7	

Awards and nominations for "Stronger"
Year	Organization	Award	Result	Ref.
2008	ASCAP Pop Music Awards	Most Performed Songs	Won	
2008	BMI London Awards	Award Winning Songs	Won	
2008	BMI Pop Awards	Award Winning Songs	Won	
2008	BMI R&B/Hip-Hop Awards	Award Winning Songs	Won	
2008	Grammy Awards	Best Rap Solo Performance	Won	
2008	International Dance Music Awards	Best Rap/Hip Hop Dance Track	Won	
2008	NAACP Image Awards	Outstanding Song	Nominated	
2008	People's Choice Awards	Favorite Hip-Hop Song	Nominated	

== Music video ==
=== Background ===
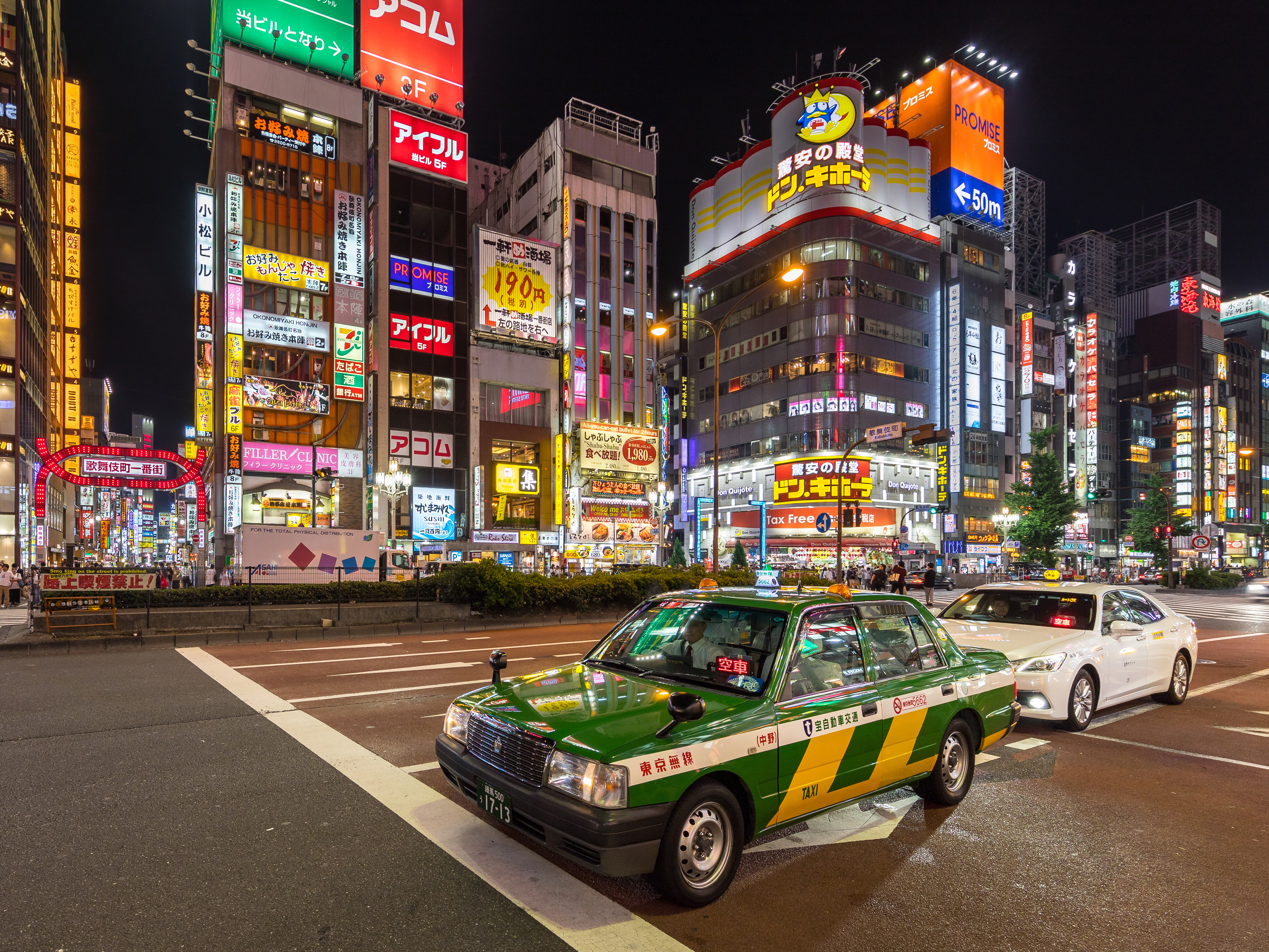
Much of the song's music video was shot in Tokyo, Japan, including scenes of the city streets.

An accompanying music video was directed and produced by Williams, with director of photography John Perez, editor Peter Johnson, executive producer Susan Linss, and post supervisor Amelia Torabi. Post-production and visual effects were done at RhinoFX by VFX Supervisor Vico Sharabani, whereas Walter Lubinski and Ian Brauner handled animation. Sal Randazzo contributed roto and smoke animation, with John Budion, Niklaus Schlumpf, and Julie Mai serving as inferno artists, assisted by Barry Furlano. Williams explained to SOHH that after hearing "Stronger", working with West again felt natural, as he thought he could easily collaborate with him. The director had previously worked with West on videos for the singles "Diamonds from Sierra Leone", "Gold Digger", and "Drive Slow" from his 2005 album Late Registration.

The video was shot guerrilla-style over 12 days in April 2007, while West was still working on "Stronger". It explores life in a sleek space-age robot world set in Japan, filmed in the country's capital Tokyo and Los Angeles (L.A.), featuring shots in Aoyama clothing store A Bathing Ape and Harajuku clothing store Billionaire Boys Club/Ice Cream. Singer-model Cassie was called to appear in the video when she was in Connecticut, flying to Tokyo the next day and working on the shoot immediately. Cassie had not worked with Williams before and admitted she was confused by the guerrilla-style, thinking the video "has to be crazy" as she danced on set. She was taken aback by her unawareness of West's latest vision and compared the setting in Tokyo to NYC's Times Square, recalling "running in the middle of the street" and filming at red lights. The music video also includes cameos from the two principal actors from the film Daft Punk's Electroma dressed as Daft Punk; West's manager Don C insisted on their appearances because "that's what it was". The video also features multiple scenes which pay homage to the 1988 anime film Akira, adding elements of sci-fi. These include the light effects on the motorbikes, the medical machinery examining West, and Daft Punk's control room. In July 2007, Williams mentioned the possibility of an extended video with unseen footage for a limited-edition internet release.

=== Development ===
West approached the Island Def Jam Music Group chairman Antonio "L.A." Reid with only a general concept for the video, lacking any storyboard or script, and was given $1,200,000 on request to fund four videos. Don C mentioned the treatment for the first visual was simply "Kanye and Hype in Japan", simplifying that they then went and shot the music video with only their visions. West felt comfortable working without a strict setup, allowing him and Williams to collaborate on the concept freely. West, a fan of Japanese directors and anime, had desired to shoot in Japan. This was also to give the video a futuristic look from the country's bikers and neon lights, in line with the creative design of Graduation.

Upon arrival in Tokyo with their team, West and Williams had ideas for video shots and a rough storyline plan. For the original plot, West played the part of a Japanese motorcycle gang member, who became involved in a bar fight with rivals where he was attacked violently and needed care from doctors. Both West and Williams had originally planned to integrate scenes from Akira into the video. Williams said that West took inspiration from the film and during the shoot, they ended up filming "parts of that movie for the video", although decided to shift towards a more abstract final version providing elements of its story. West also felt neon colors in the video were too similar to visuals of Maroon 5 and 50 Cent, deciding to spend five days on re-shoots.

Don C detailed that for the guerrilla video, West's team did not have any permits to film and simply had interpreters explain the situation to locals. The clip features shots of a real-life riot from people against a Japanese politician, which West insisted on Williams shooting after it took place directly outside of his hotel, going from Tokyo to Yokohama. After reviewing the footage in the US, West abandoned the initial storyline in favor of "the hottest shots possible". He moved filming to NYC, specifically at the Jacob K. Javits Convention Center, after struggling for 10 weeks to improve the footage. Williams was unable to film additional footage when West's dedication had taken the video extensively over-budget as he edited it up to 5 a.m, so the rapper hired a local crew. They shot scenes in NYC with West wearing a pair of Alain Mikli shutter shades, which he requested from the designer specifically for the video. The rapper first came upon the shades abandoned at a public toilet from a Paris convention in 2006, having spent three months looking for shades not found in stores and these were notably worn by Jeremy Scott. Williams explained that the video was West's vision saying, "He's a strong filmmaker in his own right, a very well-respected and strong filmmaker in my book. He really did a great job executing his vision. I was kinda his co-partner on this one."

=== Post-production and release ===
Sharabani affirmed that the process of the music video was unconventional, with West setting out to create it the same way he does songwriting. West set out to combine different elements and based on "how they relate to each-other he would then take the next step", resulting in high creativity with his "quickly-evolving vision". The video was supposed to utilize only four machine shots, until West decided to add a dozen more once the machine's style frame had been shown. Sharabani explained that West is a "very talented visual artist" whose passion is demonstrated in his process management, sticking to an "intimate and fast paced" process of continuous ideas. The supervisor described their collaboration with Williams and the team as "truly amazing" from all of the contributions; he expressed how rewarded he felt when the visual was nominated at the 2007 MTV Video Music Awards (VMAs).

A rough cut of the music video first premiered at the Tribeca Cinemas in NYC on June 19, 2007, with West editing the clip until the end of this night. He felt proud of the creation process, expressing how it was one of the first occasions "we got to make a video like how we make music". West detailed that this process consisted of intricate planning, tight scheduling, and a guerrilla-style, although Williams considered quitting the extensive shoot thrice. Dissatisfied with the video's footage from NYC, due to the director of photography not being the same as the one for Williams, West distorted the footage to resemble broadcasting over a cathode-ray tube television set. Its special effects, including robot arms and glowing starbursts, were then combined with the rest of the footage by the editors. The final music video was released on July 25, 2007.

=== Synopsis ===
In the video, West appears against a stone wall in NYC as he wears his shutter shades, which he first discovered at a public toilet following a convention in Paris during 2006.

The music video begins with the flaming trail of a speeding comet, which transitions to a laboratory where West is strapped by wires to a 3D CGI model of the medical machine that Tetsuo is examined in for Akira. West lies down while only wearing his boxers and the laboratory is operated by the Daft Punk actors, who appear with helmets in a control room as they push buttons and perform magnetic resonance imaging on the rapper. He is then shown rapping the song by a stone wall in NYC as he wears his jacket and shutter shades, while Cassie appears with a shiny kimono outfit and eye makeup resembling the 1982 film Liquid Sky when she repeatedly dances in a club. These scenes are interspersed with Japanese writing and shots of Tokyo, including the city's streets, streaked lights, and natives, as well as a motorcycle race with bright taillight trails after the actors press buttons again. The video includes a shot in a hospital where West wrestles out of his bed similarly to Tetsuo's behaviour after realizing his psychic powers and the film is also resembled by the riot, which occurs outside a hotel. For the conclusion, the scene moves back to Cassie as West seduces her.

=== Reception and accolades ===
Reviewing the rough draft of the music video for MTV, Shaheem Reid noted that it emphasizes "performance and looking fly", observing "a huge special-effects segment" from the control room and West being worked on by a machine large enough for a truck to fit. In The Village Voice, Tom Breihan highlighted that the clip is seemingly a "hyper-stylized pastiche" of Japanese sci-fi closely resembling Williams' video for fellow rapper Missy Elliott's "Sock It 2 Me" (1996), although noted it moves towards techniques used by directors to convey immediacy. He specified these techniques as choppy editing, distorted scenes, and Japanese lettering, while praising Cassie's appearance and concluding that rather than an actual story, the video is "a sort of overwhelming pileup of deft futurism". Megan Peters from ComicBook.com wrote that West's combination of Japanese culture with Akira was special, resulting in "one trippy homage". The staff of The Fader joked that the music video is equivalent to the 1941 Citizen Kane, while they affirmed it is "outstanding eye candy". Pickard was mixed in The Guardian, finding initial excitement in the visual's "futuristic atmosphere" and praising the elements of Akira, although he finalized that it was boring due to the repetition of clubbing scenes throughout.

The music video was awarded Best Hip-Hop Video at the 2007 BET Hip Hop Awards, while it received a nomination for Best Video at the 2007 MTV Europe Music Awards. The visual was nominated for Video of the Year, Best Director, and Best Editing at the 2007 MTV VMAs. After not winning awards at two ceremonies in a row, West demanded MTV to "give a black man a chance" from his hard effort at reaching number one with "Stronger" and vowed to never return to their shows. It was awarded Best Video at the 2008 MOBO Awards, alongside being nominated for Video of the Year and Best Hip-Hop Video at the 2008 MTV Video Music Awards Japan. By March 8, 2018, the music video had reached over 200 million views on YouTube.

Awards and nominations for "Stronger" music video
Year	Organization	Award	Result	Ref.
2007	BET Hip Hop Awards	Best Hip-Hop Video	Won	
2007	MTV Europe Music Awards	Best Video	Nominated	
2007	MTV Video Music Awards	Video of the Year	Nominated	
2007	MTV Video Music Awards	Best Director	Nominated	
2007	MTV Video Music Awards	Best Editing	Nominated	
2008	MOBO Awards	Best Video	Won	
2008	MTV Video Music Awards Japan	Video of the Year	Nominated	
2008	MTV Video Music Awards Japan	Best Hip-Hop Video	Nominated	
2008	MuchMusic Video Awards	Peoples Choice: Favourite International Video	Nominated	
2008	MuchMusic Video Awards	Best International Video	Nominated	
2008	NAACP Image Awards	Outstanding Music Video	Nominated	

=== Personnel ===
Credits adapted from The Inspiration Room.

Personnel

- Hype Williams – director, producer
- John Perez – director of photography
- Peter Johnson – editor
- Susan Linss – executive producer
- Yfat Neev – executive producer
- Amelia Torabi – post supervisor
- Vico Sharabani – post-production, visual effects
- Natasha Saenko – CG director, project leader
- Brian DiNoto – model
- Bogdan Mihajlovic – model
- Chris DiFiore – composing artist
- Nitant Karnik – composing artist
- Rodrigo De La Parra – composing artist
- Ivan Guerrero – lighting
- Jasmine Katatikarn – lighting
- Aditi Kapoor – lighting
- Neo Afan – digital artist
- Walter Lubinski – animator
- Ian Brauner – animator
- John Budion – inferno artist
- Niklaus Schlumpf – inferno artist
- Julie Mai – inferno artist
- Barry Furlano – inferno assistant
- Sal Randazzo – roto and smoke animation
- Camille Geier – senior VP of production
- Rick Wagonheim – managing director and partner

== Commercial performance ==
=== North America ===
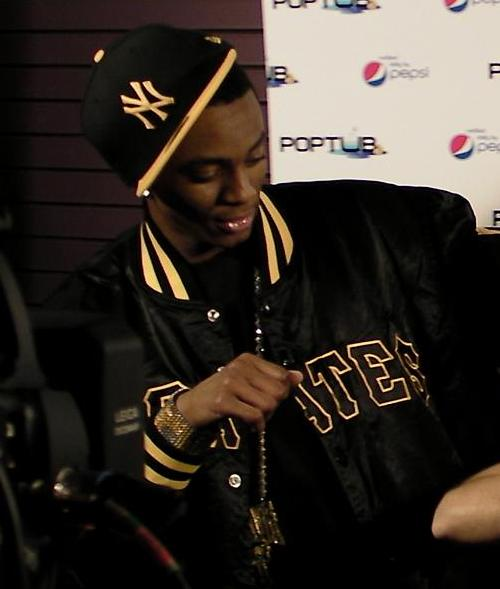
The song took the top spot of the US Billboard Hot 100 from "Crank That (Soulja Boy)", although the single knocked it off this position after one week.

"Stronger" entered the US Billboard Hot 100 at number 47 upon its single release, marking the highest debut of the week. It later reached number five on the chart issue date of September 1, 2007. A week later, the song climbed to number three on the Hot 100 with 135,000 downloads. It spent the following two weeks at number two on the chart and then rose to the top position, marking West's third number-one single in the US after "Gold Digger" in 2005. The song dethroned fellow rapper Soulja Boy's "Crank That (Soulja Boy)" for number one, receiving 205,000 digital downloads. However, "Crank That (Soulja Boy)" regained the top position from "Stronger" within a week. On the year-end chart for 2007, the song placed at number 27. Overall, it spent 27 weeks on the Hot 100. By 2009, the song stood as the chart's 14th most successful single to be released by the Island Def Jam Music Group. For the 2000s decade, it as the 91st most popular song on the Hot 100. As of May 31, 2018, the song stands as West's third biggest hit of all time in the US.

The song debuted at number 38 on the US Billboard Mainstream Top 40 and entered the top 20 at number 17 on the issue dated September 8, 2007. "Stronger" later reached the chart's top position on October 27, spending three weeks there out of its 25 charting weeks. The song became West's second chart-topper on the Mainstream Top 40, making him one of the rap acts to notably achieve success at pop radio. It also reached number one on the US Pop 100, while charting at number three on both the Hot Rap Songs and Rhythmic charts. By March 2013, the track had surpassed five million digital sales in the US. On October 6, 2021, "Stronger" was awarded a diamond certification from the Recording Industry Association of America (RIAA) for shelving 10 million certified units in the US. It became the 64th single to receive the certification from the RIAA and West's first. The song was later certified fourteen-times platinum by the RIAA on July 17, 2026, standing among the best-selling digital singles in the country by certification. In Canada, the track entered the Canadian Hot 100 at number five and rose to number one after seven weeks to become West's first chart-topper. The track spent 40 weeks on the chart, logging three weeks at the top position. It was the second best-selling digital song of 2007 in Canada, registering 94,000 sales. By December 28, 2008, the track totalled 152,000 digital sales in the country. It further reached number five on Mexico's Top 20 Inglés chart.

=== Oceania and Europe ===
"Stronger" debuted at number 20 on the New Zealand Singles Chart, reaching number 17 after three weeks and then jumping to the second position. The track peaked at number one on the chart, becoming West's second chart-topper in New Zealand. It was dethroned from the top spot by 50 Cent's "Ayo Technology", spending the following two weeks at number two on the New Zealand Singles Chart. The track lasted for 19 weeks on the chart. On November 18, 2007, it received a gold certification from Recorded Music NZ for selling over 7,500 units in New Zealand. By 2025, it was certified 5× Platinum. In Australia, the track entered the ARIA Singles Chart at number eight and peaked at number two a week later. It was blocked from the top spot by Fergie's "Big Girls Don't Cry", which sold more physical copies despite "Stronger" ranking as the number-one digital track. On the year-end chart of 2007, the track ranked as the 19th most popular single. As of September 19, 2017, it has spent 522 consecutive weeks in the top 500, standing as the longest charting single in Australia. On August 24, 2020, the track was certified octuple platinum by the Australian Recording Industry Association for shipping 560,000 units in Australia.

In the United Kingdom, "Stronger" debuted at number three on the UK Singles Chart for the issue dated August 12, 2007. The song ended the one-week run of Robyn's "With Every Heartbeat" at the top position a week later, becoming West's first number-one single on the chart. On the next chart issue, it remained at number one for a second week. For the 2007 year-end chart, the song ranked as the 19th most successful single, while it stood as the sixth most downloaded track in the UK. The song lasted for 39 weeks on the UK Singles Chart. It ranks as the 24th biggest hip-hop song of all time in the UK up to April 17, 2017. As of August 5, 2021, the song is West's second most successful single in the country behind only "Gold Digger", despite the latter not having reached number one. On January 28, 2022, "Stronger" was certified triple platinum by the British Phonographic Industry (BPI) for shelving 1,800,000 units in the UK. It also reached number one in Turkey. The track peaked at number two in both Ireland and the Netherlands, ranking as the 20th most popular song of 2007 in the former country. Similarly, it charted at number three in the territories of Norway and Scotland. The track reached number eight on the Billboard European Hot 100 Singles, while attaining top 20 positions in Finland, Germany, Switzerland, the Czech Republic, Sweden, and Denmark. "Stronger" was certified double platinum by IFPI Danmark for 180,000 shipments in Denmark on February 15, 2022, a year before it was awarded a quintuple gold certification from the Bundesverband Musikindustrie for shelving 750,000 units in Germany. On October 20, 2019, the track received a double platinum certification from Federazione Industria Musicale Italiana for selling 100,000 copies in Italy. "Stronger" ranked at number six on Apple Music's list of the best-selling songs on iTunes in 2007, while it placed at number 16 on the retailer's most downloaded songs of all time up to November 2010.

== Lawsuit ==
In June 2010, rapper Vincent Peters sued West, arguing "Stronger" was an illegitimate copy of a song of the same name he recorded in 2006. Peters argued that he provided a copy of the song to West's business manager John Monopoly, who, according to him, gave it to the rapper. Both songs share the title, make reference to Moss, and feature chorus lyrics that rhyme with "wronger" and "longer". The lawsuit also requested for West and his record labels to be prohibited from selling, distributing, and performing "Stronger", as well as to destroy all their single copies. A federal judge dismissed the claim, finding no substantial similarity, although Peters went to the 7th Circuit Court of Appeals. West's attorney Carrie Hall asserted the theft allegations would set a standard much too low for copyright infringement over common usage of words and that both songs derive their respective chorus lyrics from Nietzsche's dictum, "What does not kill him, makes him stronger." The attorney elaborated that the similarities are not enough to support infringement, as the plaintiff needs to allege sufficient facts and a judge is in a suitable position to determine this. It was also pointed out that Peters' lawsuit against West came three years after the song's release in 2007, appearing "to coincide with his attempts to publicize his new album".

In 2012, the 7th Circuit Court of Appeals ruled the lawsuit in West's favor, ordering dismissal. Diane Wood, the presiding judge, offered the full context that Nietzsche's dictum had been employed in popular works for decades, including Kelly Clarkson's "Stronger (What Doesn't Kill You)", a hit single at the time. Wood addressed the lyrical similarities of the chorus, stating they do not "rise to the level of copyright infringement". The judge also acknowledged the allegations in the reference to Moss; he noted "analogizing to models as a shorthand for beauty" is, regardless of one's feelings, commonplace in music.

== Live performances ==
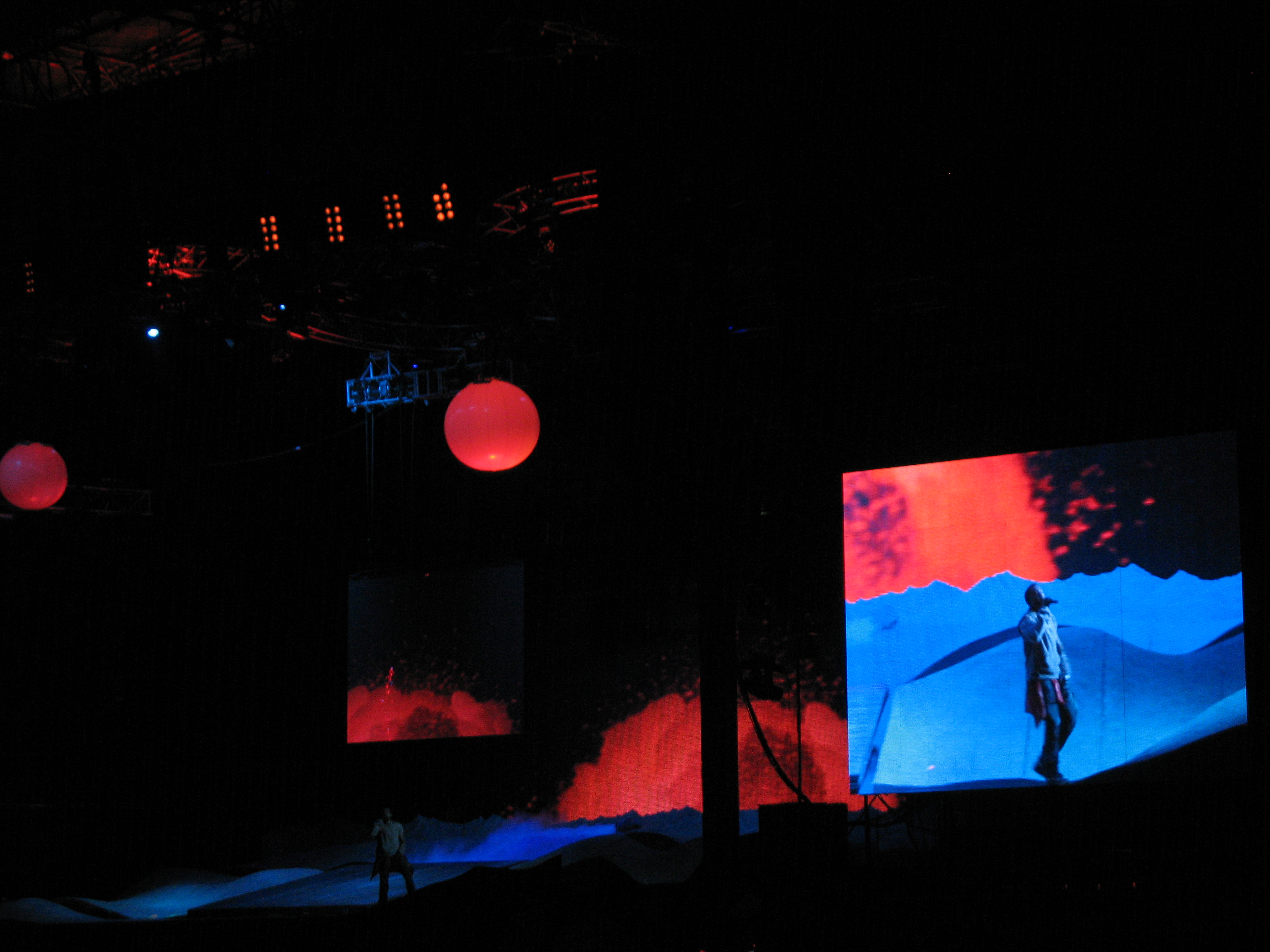
West performing "Stronger" as his closing number at the Bonnaroo Music Festival in Manchester, Tennessee during the Glow in the Dark Tour.

West performed "Stronger" live at the Concert for Diana in London on July 1, 2007. He performed the song for his concert at the Live Earth event on July 7, accompanied by a string section which included female members with exotic face paint. West performed the song at global festivals during 2007, including Canada's Cisco Systems Bluesfest, Sweden's Way Out West, and the British V and Manchester International festivals. He performed a medley for his in-studio appearance at MTV's Total Request Live on August 10, consisting of fellow Graduation single "Can't Tell Me Nothing" and the song. West performed it at the 2007 MTV VMAs, appearing in a fantasy suite at Palms' Hugh Hefner Sky Villa. The rapper insisted that he dreamt of opening the VMAs with "a real power performance" when making the song, yet the organizers wanted him in this suite rather than the main stage. He criticized MTV for exploiting him and the opening act Britney Spears, who he complained was chosen when "Stronger" was "one of the No. 1 songs". West performed a medley of the song with fellow album single "Good Life" at the premiere for season 33 of Saturday Night Live on September 28, 2007. During the launch party of the new T-Mobile Sidekick LX at Griffith Park in L.A. on October 17, West made a surprise appearance that included him performing the song.

West brought out Daft Punk as a surprise to perform a reworked version of the song for the 50th Grammy Awards at the Staples Center in L.A. on February 10, 2008, marking the duo's first televised live performance. Daft Punk were accompanied by touchscreens and a pyramid inspired by Tron (1982), which was illuminated red to reveal them in an attire of this color and West rocked his shutter shades as he was backed by ultraviolet flames. At the opening of Murakami's Brooklyn Museum exhibit on April 4, 2008, West performed the song with backing from strobe lights. From 2007 to 2008, West incorporated the song into setlists for his Glow in the Dark Tour. West performed the song an hour into his set at the 2008 Bonnaroo Music Festival in Manchester, Tennessee for the tour, ending the set early after negative crowd reactions. The rapper posted that he was heartbroken to not deliver the song's "greatest form" with an apology for lacking the ability to perform, admitting he sometimes spends two to three sleepless days improvising performances and saying: "I have to ice my knees after every show and they hurt when I walk through the airport." Dressed in an all red outfit, West performed "Stronger" at Z100's the Jingle Ball concert at NYC's Madison Square Garden on December 12, 2008.

West performed the song with an intro in February 2009 for the closing number of his live album VH1 Storytellers (2010), delivering a stripped-down version. The version largely omitted the Daft Punk sample and featured accompaniment from drummers at its breakdown, with lighting in the background. West performed the song on Ellen DeGeneres' Bigger, Longer & Wider Show, which aired via TBS on June 27, 2009. The rapper closed his set at the 2009 Wireless Festival in Hyde Park, London with the song, wearing his shades and a black suit jacket. He appeared on elevated section of the stage while surrounded by four topless dancers that wore tiaras and body paint, bowing to the audience and declaring he loved them after the performance. On August 6, 2009, West closed Casio G-Shock's the World event at Cipriani's on Wall Street with the song, afront a shifting digital display screen that counted down the time he was onstage. West performed the song at the Coachella Festival in 2011, after his earlier promise following performances of singles, "The hits ain't over yet. We just keep goin' and goin'." West altered lyrics about how he would "do anything for a blonde dyke" in the second verse of the track to be in the past tense, aimed at his ex-lover Amber Rose. Afterwards, rumors sprang of a backstage confrontation of Rose's then-boyfriend and rapper Wiz Khalifa with West at the festival. The rapper dismissed the rumors as made up, although he considered West's line "a low thing" where he would try not to become involved. West opened his set for the 2011 Victoria's Secret Fashion Show at Lexington Avenue Armory in NYC with the song, wearing a Versace for H&M jacket, black leather pants, and Nike Air Yeezy 2s. His introduction mentioned he cancelled a 2007 performance of it at the show after his mother's death, detailing that she went from his superhero to his "super-angel".

West included a shortened version of "Stronger" in a medley of over 10 songs for 12-12-12: The Concert for Sandy Relief at Madison Square Garden on December 12, 2012, while rocking a Pyrex hoodie and leather kilt. He delivered a performance of the song at the 2013 Governors Ball, backed by a modest DJ setup. West performed the song on The Yeezus Tour (2013–14), including a stripped-down version at a Brooklyn stop on November 21, 2013. On February 25, 2014, West performed a five-minute medley of his greatest hits in chronological order by album on Late Night with Seth Meyers, including "Stronger". Despite the negative reactions to West's appearance at the 2008 Bonnaroo Music Festival, he appeared at the event again in 2014 and performed "Stronger". West stopped the song abruptly to ask the audience to "make some noise" for their enjoyment, questioning how many traveled long distances to attend and "don't give a fuck what the press says". He specified that his maximum effort was being delivered and his self-belief allows others to appreciate themselves, calling out the media trying to make him look crazy despite him performing for 90,000 people and comparing himself to renowned musicians Jimi Hendrix, John Lennon, and Jim Morrison. West resumed the song and indicated that previous festival criticisms would be silenced, receiving a mixed crowd reaction after his speech. The rapper performed the song in L.A. for the final night of the Made in America Festival on August 31, 2014. On December 1, West performed "Stronger" at a concert on World AIDS Day, telling the DJ to end the instrumental when he left it playing past the full length. The rapper opened his headlining set at the 2015 Glastonbury Festival with the song, appearing a metre below several rows of lights. The crowd chanted along to the song despite the petitions against West's appearance gaining traction, while he wore a paint-covered denim jacket and jeans and walked around the stage twirling his microphone stand. West opened his set at the closing ceremony of the 2015 Pan American Games with the song, wearing his denim jeans and a blue jumper as he performed to around 30,000 people. The rapper then clapped his hands, laid down, and jumped around the stage, requesting the lights to be turned on for the "400 million people watching" worldwide. West performed the song throughout his 2016 Saint Pablo Tour, including an L.A. stop where Canadian musician Drake danced as he rapped along on October 26.

== Cover versions and appearances in media / culture ==
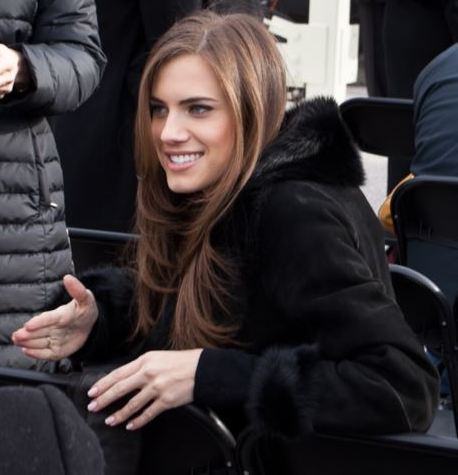
Allison Williams, acting as the character Marnie, performs the song as a slower and stripped down love ballad in the 2013 TV series Girls, after she had rapped it during her rehearsals.

Rock band Thirty Seconds to Mars delivered a cover of "Stronger" in their genre for Jo Whiley's edition of the BBC Radio 1 Live Lounge in September 2007; they won the Ultimate Live Lounge Cover for their version and presenter Fearne Cotton gave them a clay trophy for winning. Thirty Seconds to Mars said that covering the song for the radio station "helped change our lives" by gathering a wider audience to their pleasure and it was also included on the bonus disc of the band's 2009 album This Is War, alongside the West collaboration "Hurricane 2.0". On January 25, 2012, BadBadNotGood released a bluegrass cover of the song with a music video that offers an anti-bullying message. In a March 2013 episode of the HBO show Girls, actress Allison Williams performs the song as a slow, stripped down love ballad as Marnie at the birthday party of the character's ex-boyfriend Charlie. Williams imparted that despite rapping the song when rehearsing her script, she was told by Lena Dunham it would instead be a ballad for the episode. On February 12, 2017, the actress admitted that she has not been able to watch the performance in full, admitting that she was relieved during a HBO playback session when the song's part in the episode was not shown.

On August 27, 2007, A-Trak premiered his remix of the song, altering the Daft Punk sample and adding a new beat with synths. "Stronger" was used for the trailer of the 2007 film The Kingdom. Katie Holmes played the song for her 10-hour weekly workouts to prepare for the year's NYC Marathon, during which she listened to it repeatedly in the last six miles. On November 19, 2007, the song was included on the compilation album Now That's What I Call Music! 68. The New York Giants made their entrance to the song at Super Bowl XLII, before their game against the New England Patriots that they won. It appears in an action scene of Never Back Down, a 2008 film about high school mixed martial artists. The Jabbawockeez danced to the song to celebrate being crowned champions of the first season finale of America's Best Dance Crew on April 4, 2008. At the 2008 Stanley Cup playoffs, the New York Rangers made their entrance to the song. On January 21, 2009, it was featured in a promotional video for Animal Planet's new show Jockeys.

Leo Flynn produced a Rockabye Baby! CD that consisted of instrumental lullaby renditions of West's tracks and was released on May 18, 2010, including "Stronger" as the third track. In 2011, the song was used in the tennis video game Top Spin 4. It is featured in a slow motion scene of the wolfpack boarding an airplane to Thailand in the 2011 film The Hangover Part II, marking the second instance of West's music being used in all three installments of The Hangover. On April 2, 2012, fellow rapper Moses Stone performed a mashup of "Stronger" with West's 2010 single "Power" for the second season of The Voice. The rapper sang the song's hook in the style of a gospel ballad, moving into a rap for the first verse where he censored the profanity. He was backed by dancers, including an acrobat that handspringed his way off the stage at the top of the performance.

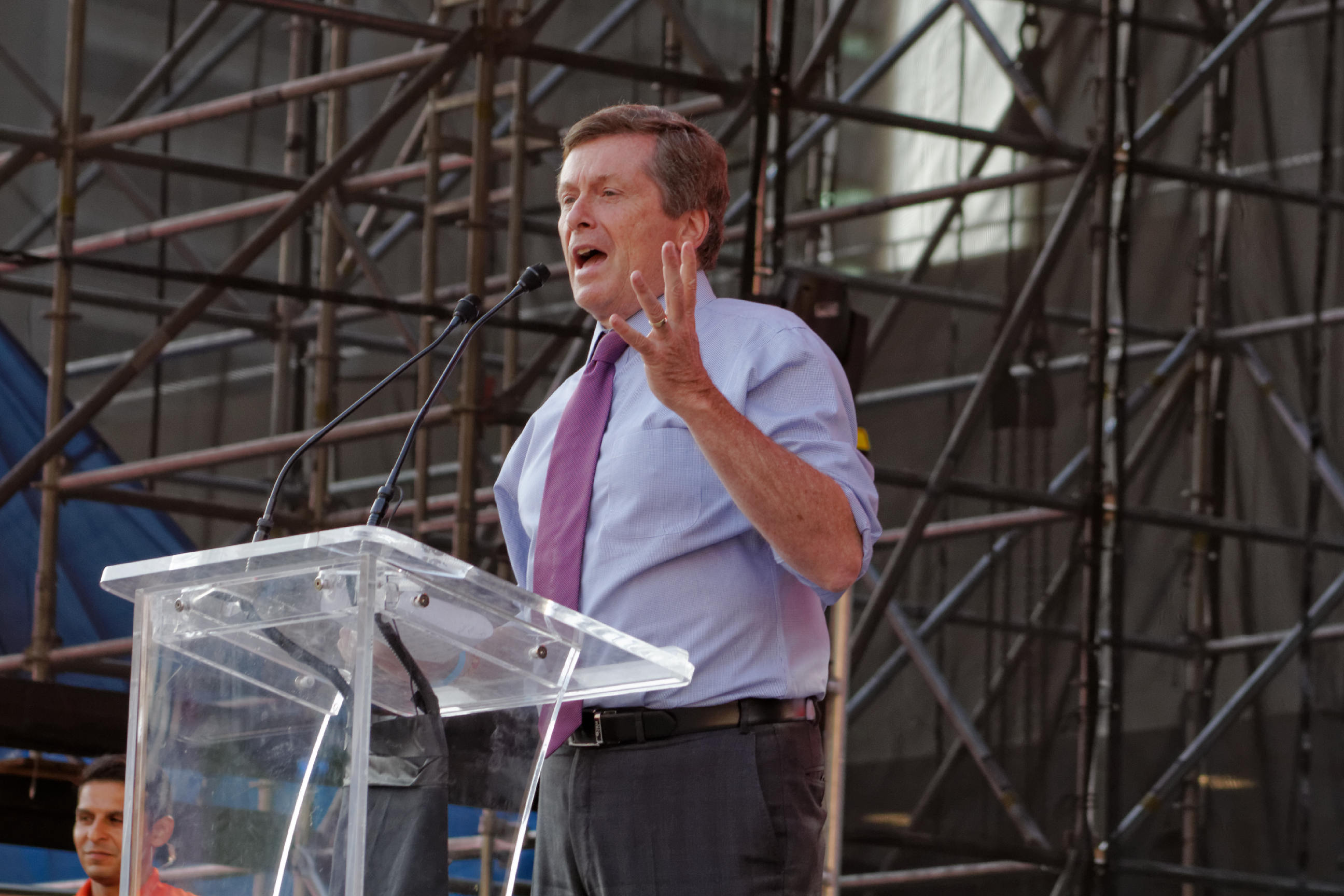
John Tory used the song to soundtrack a parody video about West in 2015, set on the Toronto subway.

In 2014, pop rap artist G-Eazy closely interpolated lyrics from the song on his track "Let's Get's Lost" that features Devon Baldwin. After mistakenly calling West a Canadian rapper when he was asked about him performing at the 2015 Pan American Games, Toronto mayor John Tory used "Stronger" in a parody video. The mayor grooved to the song when waiting on a platform of the Toronto subway and found a story about West's then-wife Kim Kardashian when he read Rolling Stone on the train; the video was taken down by the copyright holder, despite Tory's office insisting it was made for fun. In November 2016, the song was featured in a commercial for the video game Watch Dogs 2.

== Legacy ==
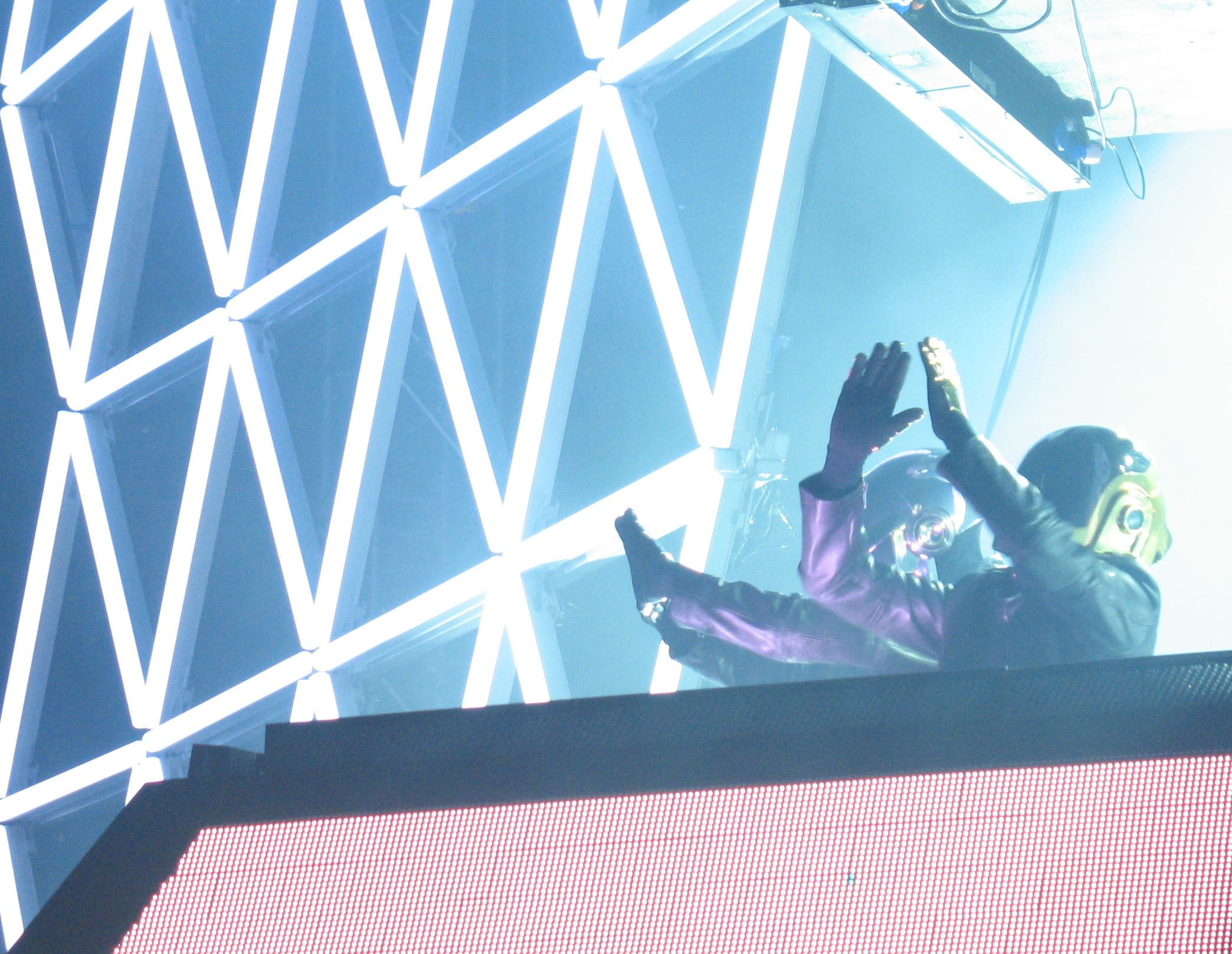
The sample of Daft Punk was seen as a key part in the song's electronica influence across hip hop, and sales of "Harder, Better, Faster, Stronger" rose after its release and the duo's Alive 2007 album tour (pictured).

Considered one of West's most radio-friendly songs, "Stronger" has been credited with not only influencing hip hop artists to incorporate electronica elements into their music, but also with playing a part in the revival of disco-infused music in the late 2000s. The song was looked at as a turning point in how the talents of West were viewed in his career and it brought him more commercial success. In a piece for NME, Luke Morgan Britton saw the song as the transition between the rapper's self-declared "'Old Kanye' and the more avant-garde, era-defining and zeitgeist-defining music" he later moved towards. Britton elaborated that West diversified his influences for Graduation by taking on electronic and indie music from across the world, noting the former genre on the song particularly changed hip hop's sound and demonstrated his "Midas-like touch" by epitomizing an era with his production, attributing this to the Daft Punk sample. Breihan noted for Stereogum that the song represented the biggest and most successful example of West moving towards "theme songs for people", which were set for sing-alongs and sounding anthemic after his stadium tours. The song helped bring Daft Punk to prominence in the US; Rolling Stone staff gave credit for "the beginning of the group's path to mainstream success". Following its release and Daft Punk's Alive 2007 tour, sales of "Harder, Better, Faster, Stronger" went from 1,000 per week to between 5,000 and 7,000.

Following the song's music video in 2007, West's shutter shades became popular across the world, particularly in the hip hop community. The shades were sold on the Glow in the Dark Tour and also worn by the likes of Snoop Dogg, Lil Jon, and Paris Hilton, while imitation copies were on sale for $5 at shopping malls and gas stations. West received a phone call requesting for a jacket like his one in the visual from Michael Jackson, who was an idol to him. He re-uses the "I need you right now" refrain of the song on the outro to "On Sight", a track from 2013's Yeezus. On August 3, "Stronger" was used in the BBC Radio 1Xtra episode "10 Moments That Made Kanye West".

In 2011, "Stronger" was voted the greatest workout song of all time after topping the nationwide "March Music Madness" poll of Gold's Gym. The song was ranked as the third best feel-good record from a black musical act by The Boombox in 2011, while it was named as the 25th best hip hop workout song of all time by Men's Health in 2019. In 2020, Time crowned the song as the 31st best workout record of all time and uDiscoverMusic placed it at number one on their list, with Louis Chilton hailing the influence on pop and hip hop. The song was ranked by as the 28th best Hot 100 number-one of the 2000s decade by Cleveland.com in 2021, whose author Troy L. Smith felt that West was the only rap act able to masterfully sample Daft Punk and produce a hip hop song "this centered on EDM". In 2024, Time Out selected it as their 13th best running song.

The track is included in the 2015 edition of Robert Dimery's book 1001 Songs You Must Hear Before You Die. "Stronger" was named as the sixth most popular workout song on Spotify in 2021, based on the data of appearances on playlists for working out. It was named as the platform's sixth most popular workout in 2021, based on the data of appearances on playlists for working out. As of December 25, 2023, the song has reached 1.3 billion streams on the platform, standing as the most streamed release from Graduation. In a 2024 analysis of appearances on motivational playlists of Spotify and Apple Music, "Stronger" was ranked as the most motivational song.

In 2026 during a United States House hearing, Secretary of State Marco Rubio quoted the line "since O.J. had Isotoners" from the song.

== Track listing ==
European CD single

1. "Can't Tell Me Nothing" (Album Version)
2. "Stronger" (Album Version)

CD single

1. "Stronger" (Album Version) – 5:15
2. "Stronger" (Instrumental) – 5:15
3. "Can't Tell Me Nothing" (Album Version) – 4:32
4. "Stronger" (Video)

Digital download

1. "Stronger" – 5:12
2. "Can't Tell Me Nothing" – 4:32

== Credits and personnel ==
Information taken from Graduation liner notes.

Recording

- Recorded at Ape Sounds (Tokyo, Japan), Sony Music Studios (NYC) and The Record Plant (Hollywood, CA)
- Mixed at Larrabee North Studios (Universal City, CA) and Battery Studios (NYC)

Personnel

- Kanye West – songwriter, production
- Thomas Bangalter – songwriter
- Guy-Manuel de Homem-Christo – songwriter
- Edwin Birdsong – songwriter
- Mike Dean – keyboards, guitars, extended outro
- Timbaland – additional programming, drum programming, drum sound design
- Seiji Sekine – recording
- Andrew Dawson – recording
- Anthony Kilhoffer – recording
- Manny Marroquin – mix engineer
- Kengo Sakura – assistant mix engineer
- Bram Tobey – assistant mix engineer
- Jason Agel – assistant mix engineer
- Nate Hertweck – assistant mix engineer
- Jared Robbins – assistant mix engineer
- La Mar "Mars" Edwards – keyboards
- Andy Chatterley – keyboards

== Charts ==
=== Weekly charts ===
Chart performance for "Stronger"
Chart (2007–2008)	Peak position
Australia (ARIA)	2
Austria (Ö3 Austria Top 40)	22
Belgium (Ultratip Bubbling Under Flanders)	3
Belgium (Ultratip Bubbling Under Wallonia)	6
Canada Hot 100 (Billboard)	1
Canada CHR/Top 40 (Billboard)	1
Canada Hot AC (Billboard)	17
Czech Republic Airplay (ČNS IFPI)	19
Denmark (Tracklisten)	20
European Hot 100 Singles (Billboard)	8
Finland (Suomen virallinen lista)	11
France (SNEP)	33
Germany (GfK)	17
Hungary (Dance Top 40)	39
Hungary (Rádiós Top 40)	34
Ireland (IRMA)	2
Italy (FIMI)	35
Lithuania (EHR)	1
Mexico (Top 20 – Inglés)	5
Netherlands (Tipparade)	2
Netherlands (Single Top 100)	35
New Zealand (Recorded Music NZ)	1
Norway (VG-lista)	3
Russia Airplay (TopHit)	36
Scottish Singles Sales (Official Charts)	3
Sweden (Sverigetopplistan)	19
Switzerland (Schweizer Hitparade)	18
Turkey (Billboard Türkiye)	1
UK Singles (Official Charts)	1
UK Hip Hop/R&B (Official Charts)	1
US Billboard Hot 100	1
US Dance Airplay (Billboard)	21
US Hot R&B/Hip-Hop Songs (Billboard)	30
US Hot Rap Songs (Billboard)	3
US Pop Airplay (Billboard)	1
US Pop 100 (Billboard)	1
US Rhythmic Airplay (Billboard)	3

=== Year-end charts ===
2007 year-end chart performance for "Stronger"
Chart (2007)	Position
Australia (ARIA)	19
Brazil (Crowley)	135
European Hot 100 Singles (Billboard)	33
Germany (Official German Charts)	80
Ireland (IRMA)	20
New Zealand (Recorded Music NZ)	42
Russia Airplay (TopHit)	139
Switzerland (Schweizer Hitparade)	74
UK Singles (Official Charts Company)	19
UK Urban (Music Week)	16
US Billboard Hot 100	27
US Rhythmic (Billboard)	17

2008 year-end chart performance for "Stronger"
Chart (2008)	Position
Canada (Canadian Hot 100)	33
UK Singles (Official Charts Company)	140

2016 year-end chart performance for "Stronger"
Chart (2016)	Position
Australia Urban (ARIA)	36

2017 year-end chart performance for "Stronger"
Chart (2017)	Position
Australia Urban (ARIA)	39

=== Decade-end charts ===
Decade-end chart performance for "Stronger"
Chart (2000–2009)	Position
US Billboard Hot 100	91

== Certifications and sales ==
Certifications and sales for "Stronger"
Region	Certification	Certified units/sales
Australia (ARIA)	8× Platinum	560,000^{‡}
Brazil (Pro-Música Brasil)	2× Platinum	120,000^{‡}
Canada Digital downloads	—	152,000
Denmark (IFPI Danmark)	2× Platinum	180,000^{‡}
Germany (BVMI)	5× Gold	750,000^{‡}
Italy (FIMI)	2× Platinum	100,000^{‡}
New Zealand (RMNZ)	5× Platinum	150,000^{‡}
Spain (Promusicae)	Platinum	60,000^{‡}
United Kingdom (BPI)	4× Platinum	2,400,000^{‡}
United States (RIAA)	14× Platinum	14,000,000^{‡}
United States (RIAA) Mastertone	Platinum	1,000,000^{*}
^{*} Sales figures based on certification alone.^{‡} Sales+streaming figures based on certification alone.

== Release history ==
Release dates and formats for "Stronger"
Region	Date	Format	Label(s)	Ref.
United States	July 31, 2007	Rhythmic contemporary radio	Roc A Fella; Def Jam	
United Kingdom	August 3, 2007	Digital download	Roc A Fella; Def Jam	
Australia	August 10, 2007	CD Maxi	Roc A Fella; Def Jam	
Europe	August 13, 2007	CD single	Mercury	
Various	August 20, 2007	CD single	Roc A Fella; Def Jam	

== See also ==
- Akira (1988 film)
- Harder, Better, Faster, Stronger
- List of best-selling singles in Australia
- List of best-selling singles in the United States
- List of Canadian Hot 100 number-one singles of 2007
- List of number-one singles from the 2000s (New Zealand)
- List of UK Singles Chart number ones of the 2000s
- List of Billboard Hot 100 number-one singles of 2007
- List of Billboard Mainstream Top 40 number-one songs of 2007
- Yeezus
