= List of Billboard Mainstream Top 40 number-one songs of 2007 =

This is a list of songs which reached number one on the Billboard Mainstream Top 40 chart in 2007.

During 2007, a total of 13 singles hit number-one on the charts.

== Chart history ==
| Issue date | Song | Artist(s) | Ref. |
|---|---|---|---|
| January 6 | "Irreplaceable" | Beyoncé | |
| January 13 | "Irreplaceable" | Beyoncé | |
| January 20 | "Irreplaceable" | Beyoncé | |
| January 27 | "Irreplaceable" | Beyoncé | |
| February 3 | "Irreplaceable" | Beyoncé | |
| February 10 | "Irreplaceable" | Beyoncé | |
| February 17 | "Irreplaceable" | Beyoncé | |
| February 24 | "Say It Right" | Nelly Furtado | |
| March 3 | "Say It Right" | Nelly Furtado | |
| March 10 | "Say It Right" | Nelly Furtado | |
| March 17 | "Say It Right" | Nelly Furtado | |
| March 24 | "What Goes Around...Comes Around" | Justin Timberlake | |
| March 31 | "It's Not Over" | Daughtry | |
| April 7 | "It's Not Over" | Daughtry | |
| April 14 | "Cupid's Chokehold" | Gym Class Heroes featuring Patrick Stump | |
| April 21 | "Cupid's Chokehold" | Gym Class Heroes featuring Patrick Stump | |
| April 28 | "Cupid's Chokehold" | Gym Class Heroes featuring Patrick Stump | |
| May 5 | "Cupid's Chokehold" | Gym Class Heroes featuring Patrick Stump | |
| May 12 | "Cupid's Chokehold" | Gym Class Heroes featuring Patrick Stump | |
| May 19 | "U + Ur Hand" | Pink | |
| May 26 | "U + Ur Hand" | Pink | |
| June 2 | "U + Ur Hand" | Pink | |
| June 9 | "U + Ur Hand" | Pink | |
| June 16 | "Girlfriend" | Avril Lavigne | |
| June 23 | "Summer Love" | Justin Timberlake | |
| June 30 | "Summer Love" | Justin Timberlake | |
| July 7 | "Summer Love" | Justin Timberlake | |
| July 14 | "Summer Love" | Justin Timberlake | |
| July 21 | "Big Girls Don't Cry" | Fergie | |
| July 28 | "Big Girls Don't Cry" | Fergie | |
| August 4 | "Big Girls Don't Cry" | Fergie | |
| August 11 | "Big Girls Don't Cry" | Fergie | |
| August 18 | "Big Girls Don't Cry" | Fergie | |
| August 25 | "Big Girls Don't Cry" | Fergie | |
| September 1 | "Big Girls Don't Cry" | Fergie | |
| September 8 | "Big Girls Don't Cry" | Fergie | |
| September 15 | "The Way I Are" | Timbaland featuring Keri Hilson | |
| September 22 | "The Way I Are" | Timbaland featuring Keri Hilson | |
| September 29 | "The Way I Are" | Timbaland featuring Keri Hilson | |
| October 6 | "Who Knew" | Pink | |
| October 13 | "Who Knew" | Pink | |
| October 20 | "Who Knew" | Pink | |
| October 27 | "Stronger" | Kanye West | |
| November 3 | "Stronger" | Kanye West | |
| November 10 | "Stronger" | Kanye West | |
| November 17 | "Apologize" | Timbaland presents OneRepublic | |
| November 24 | "Apologize" | Timbaland presents OneRepublic | |
| December 1 | "Apologize" | Timbaland presents OneRepublic | |
| December 8 | "Apologize" | Timbaland presents OneRepublic | |
| December 15 | "Apologize" | Timbaland presents OneRepublic | |
| December 22 | "Apologize" | Timbaland presents OneRepublic | |
| December 29 | "Apologize" | Timbaland presents OneRepublic | |

== See also ==
- 2007 in music
