= Wolford =

Austrian lingerie company

Wolford AG
- Logo of Wolford
- Company type: Public
- Traded as: WBAG: WLFD
- Industry: Apparel
- Founded: 1950
- Headquarters: Bregenz, Austria
- Number of locations: approx. 60 countries, 260 stores
- Key people: Silvia Azzali (CCO), Doina Ciobanu sustainability advisor
- Products: Hosiery, bras, panties, and lingerie
- Production output: Austria, China and Slovenia
- Revenue: €137,22 million (2018/19)
- Number of employees: approx. 1,347 (FTE)
- Parent: Fosun International (58%)
- Website: www.wolford.com

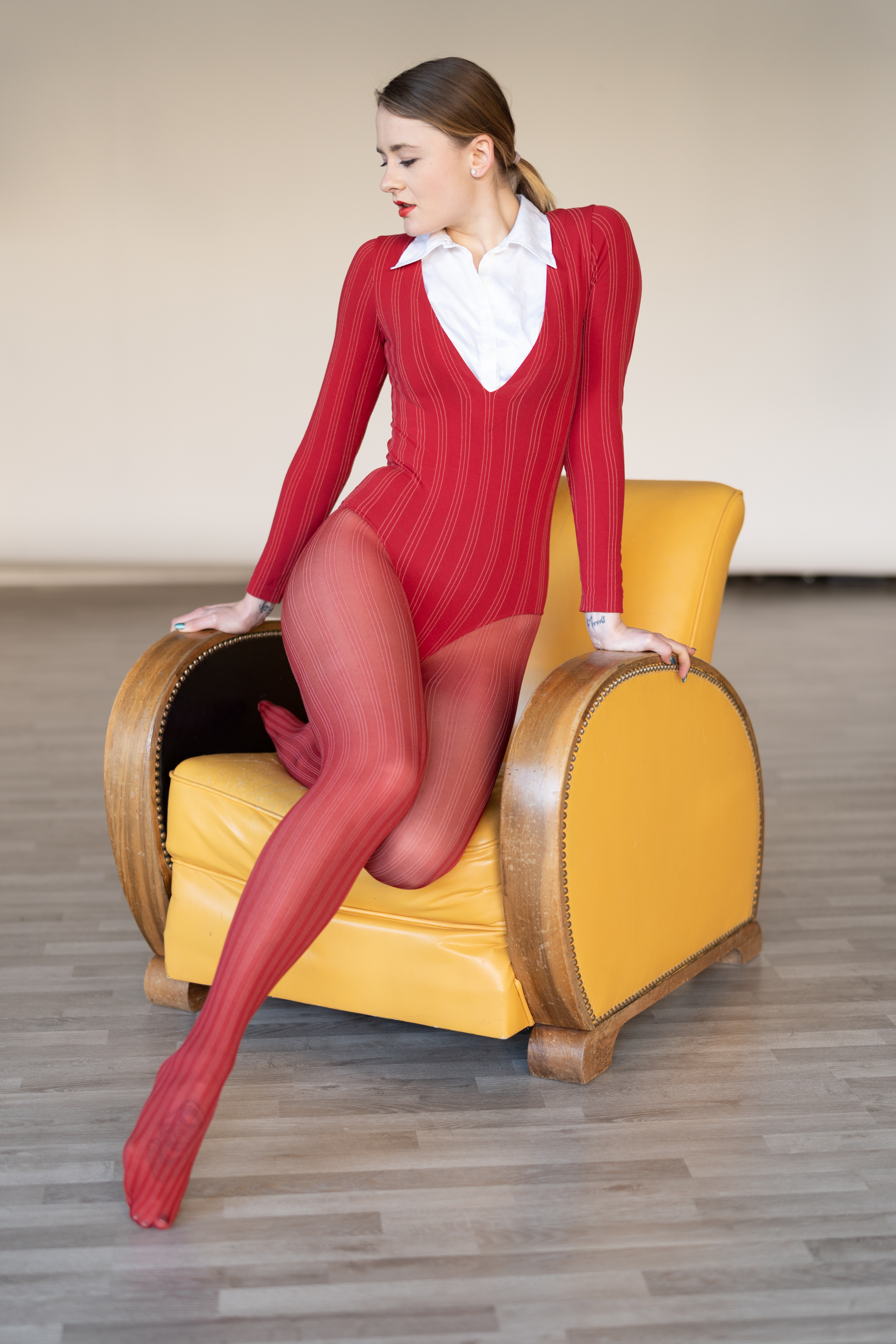
Bodysuit with detachable blouse insert and tights from the Cosmopolitan collection of autumn / winter 2004

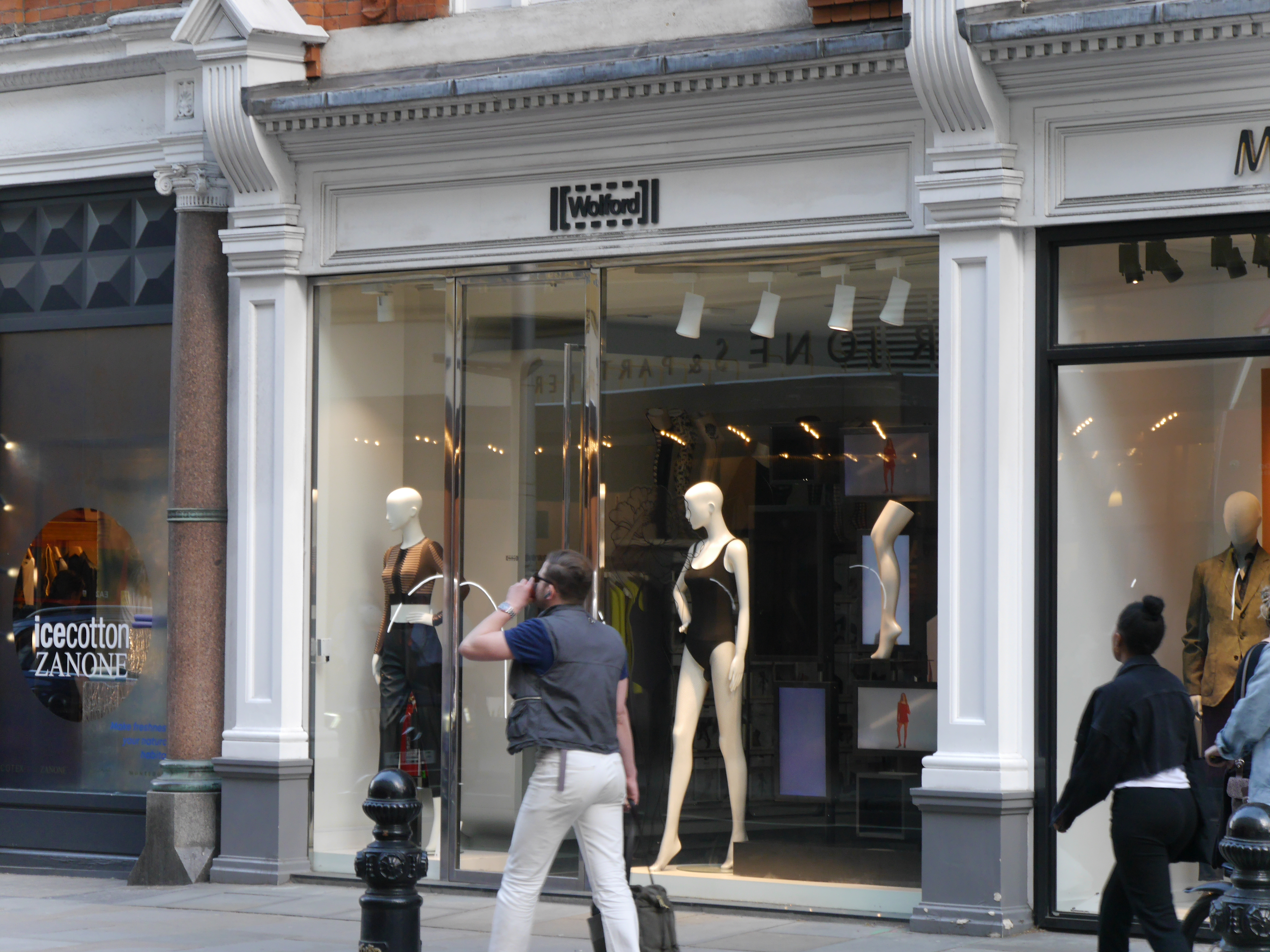
Wolford store, King's Road, London, 2022

Wolford, headquartered in Bregenz on Lake Constance in Austria, is a textile manufacturer of tights, bodysuits and underwear, as well as women's clothing and accessories.

Wolford has 16 subsidiaries and markets its products in approx. 60 countries through more than 260 own and partner-operated retail-stores, 3,000 trading partners and 17 online stores. Listed on the Vienna Stock Exchange since 1995, in the fiscal year 2018/19 (May 1, 2018 to April 30, 2019) the company generated revenues of 137.22 million euros. Wolford has approximately 1,347 employees (FTE).

The company is known for its seamless products such as tights, but also for its co-operations with photographers such as Helmut Newton, Howard Schatz, Ellen von Unwerth, Jean Baptiste Mondino and Rankin. For its collections, Wolford has co-operated with designers such as Karl Lagerfeld and Vivienne Westwood.

== History ==
In 1949 in Bregenz on Lake Constance (Austria), a city with a genuine textile heritage, the industrialist Reinhold Wolff from Vorarlberg (Austria) and the retail entrepreneur Walter Palmers (1903–1983) from Vienna founded a company called Wolff & Co. KG, focussing on the production of women's stockings made from real and artificial silk. They customized used American Cotton machines specifically for their own purposes, and for the first time processed polyamide fiber into stockings. The following year, the Wolford brand was officially registered. The brand name is a portmanteau of the name of the founder Reinhold Wolff and the city of Oxford. It should be internationally applicable. The international expansion began in the 1970s. In 1988, the company carried out a strategic refocusing and positioned its products in the luxury segment, which continues to today and is still being expanded. In addition to that, in April 1988, the company was transformed into a stock corporation. On 14 February 1995 Wolford went public with the so-called "Lady Share" in Vienna and Paris. The company made its mark over the years mainly due to its new seamless products, e.g. tights and bodysuits, as well as collaborations with designers such as Karl Lagerfeld, Emilio Pucci, Zac Posen, Kenzo, Valentino and Vivienne Westwood. Further, co-operations with photographers such as Helmut Newton, Ellen von Unwerth and Mario Testino contributed to the brand awareness.

== Company ==
Since May 2018, Chinese conglomerate Fosun International has been the majority shareholder in Wolford AG, holding approximately 58% of the company's share capital. As with the other fashion companies it owns, Fosun manages Wolford within its Lanvin Group portfolio.

Wolford's executive board solely comprises Silvia Azzali, who serves as the company's Chief Commercial Officer and sole director. Until July 2022 the board had also included Andrew Thorndike in the role of chief operating officer. Both Azzali and Thorndike were promoted to their respective roles in October 2019 upon the resignation of the company's then-CEO Axel Dreher with Thorndike credited by the company as responsible for a complete corporate restructuring. Dreher had served as the company's CEO since 2017; the vacancy created by his resignation remains unfilled.

Wolford is additionally governed by a supervisory board composed of

- Junyang Shao (Chairwoman of the Presidium, Appointed through to 35th AGM 2021/22)
- Thomas Dressendörfer (Member of the Presidium, Appointed through to 36th AGM 2022/23)
- Yun Cheng (Member, Appointed through to 36th AGM 2022/23)
- Matthias Freise (Member, Appointed through to 37th AGM 2023/24)
- David Chan (Member, appointed in July 2022)

Two representatives are delegated by the staff council: Anton Mathis and Christian Medwed.

== Products and fabrication ==
Wolford produces tights and stockings for women and men, underwear for women, women's clothing such as skirts, tops, shirts, pullovers etc., as well as accessories. All products used to be manufactured in Europe (Austria and Slovenia) but since the change of ownership in 2018, some products are manufactured in China. Since March 2015, Wolford is a partner of Bluesign Technologies, a global network working for more sustainable production processes and more transparency in the fabrication of textiles.

In September 2018, Wolford launched the first biodegradable pullovers, T-shirts, and leggings. Developed within the Austrian “Smart Textiles” industry initiative, these products are fully compostable. In April 2019, the company received the “Cradle to Cradle Certified™ (Gold)” award for developing technically regenerative (i.e. fully recyclable) products. It will be presenting the first corresponding legwear products in 2020. Wolford is the first and so far the only company in the apparel and textile industry to receive “Gold” certification from “Cradle to Cradle” for developing environmentally compatible products in both categories (“biodegradable” and “technically recyclable”).
