= Vuarnet =

French eyewear brand

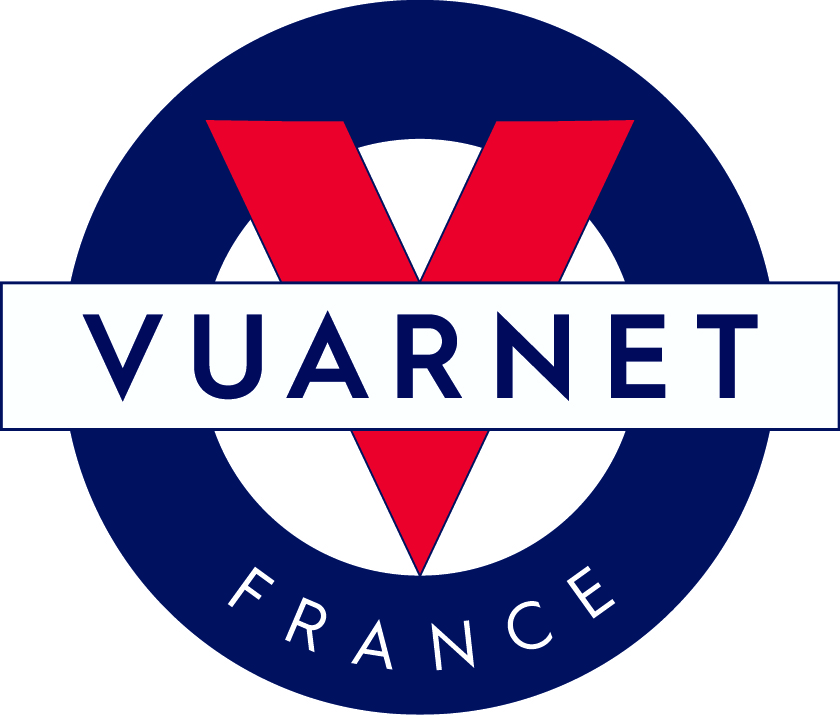
- Product type: Eyewear
- Current owner: Thélios
- Produced by: Sporoptic Pouilloux S.A.
- Country: France
- Introduced: 1961
- Markets: Worldwide
- Website: www.vuarnet.com

Vuarnet (French pronunciation: [vyaʁnɛ]) is a premium heritage brand of sunglasses founded in 1957 that is owned by French manufacturer Sporoptic Pouilloux S.A. Thélios (LVMH) acquired Sporoptic Pouilloux S.A. and Vuarnet in 2023.

== History ==
The sunglasses were developed from the invention of the Skilynx lens in 1957 by French opticians Roger Pouilloux and Joseph Hatchiguian. Skilynx are special, coated, yellow mirror lenses designed to enhance perception of contrasts in conditions of white-out as well as reducing the effects of snow glare. Allowing skiers to better discern variations in snowy terrain without distortion.

The anti-glare sunglasses were originally marketed under the name 'Skilynx Acier', and they were provided to the French Ski Team. After Jean Vuarnet, a French alpine ski racer, won the gold medal in the Downhill at the 1960 Winter Olympics while wearing cat eye model "002", an agreement was reached in 1961 to market the sunglasses using his surname as the brand name. In 1974 Vuarnet branched out to mountaineering eyewear by introducing its 'Glacier' model of glacier glasses, which were worn by French alpinist Jean Afanassieff during the first successful French expedition to the summit of Mount Everest in 1978.

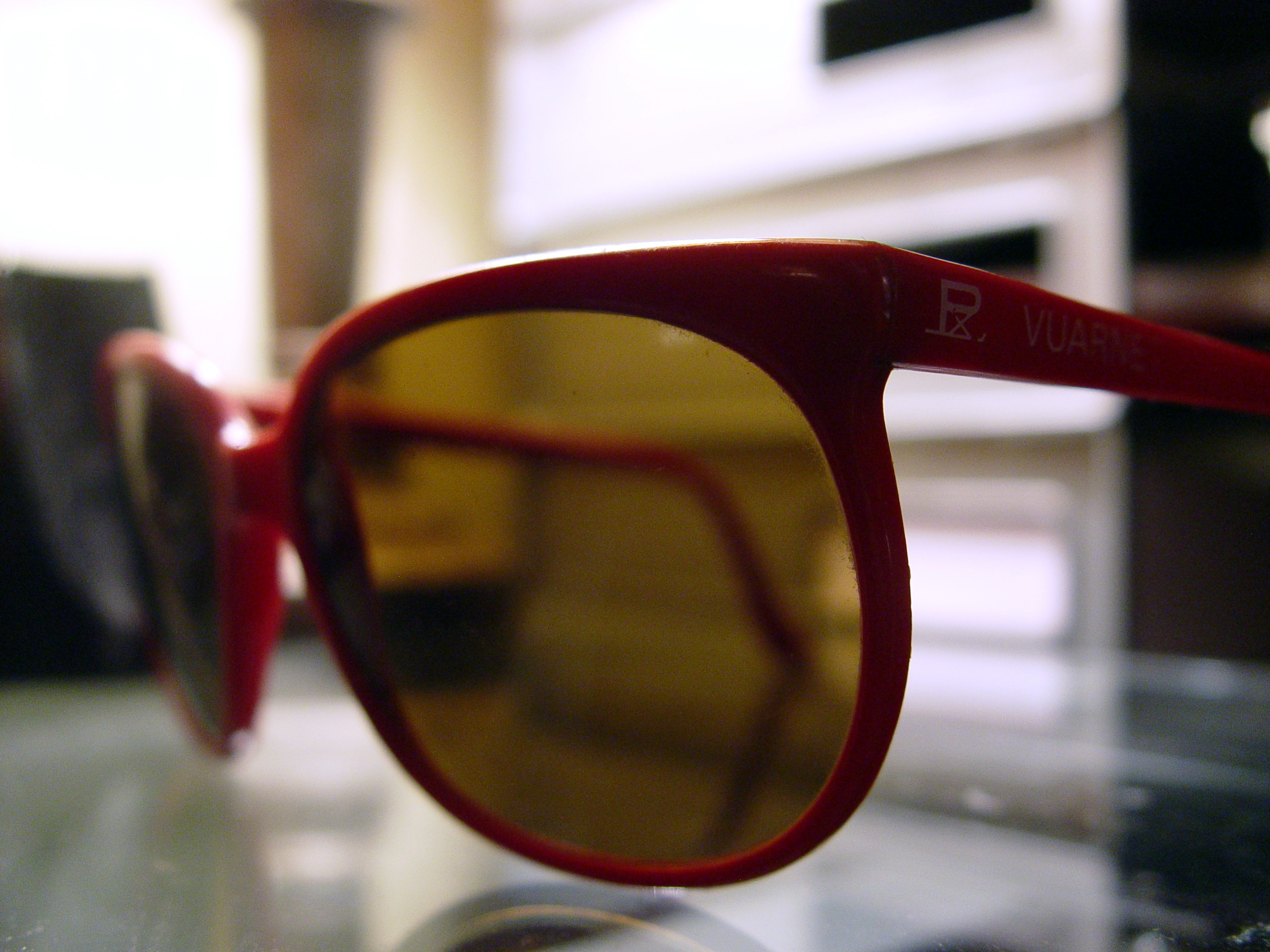
Vuarnet PX Pouilloux sunglasses (model 002) from the 1980s

With the slogan "It's a Vuarnet day today" and Olympic alpine pedigree the brand would find success in North America as a symbol of French chic. The company was an official corporate sponsor of the 1984 Summer Olympics in Los Angeles. Vuarnet was in its heyday in the 1980s and 1990s, widely known for their bold mirrored lenses and colorful frames. The brand released many (related) products, such as ski equipment and apparel, but sunglasses remained its most popular item.

By the 2000s the brand had faded from prominence and had left the US market. In 2009, 75% of Vuarnet was purchased by Alain Mikli. The company then made 40 million euros in revenue, but -10 million euros in losses. Neo Investment Partners acquired Vuarnet out of bankruptcy in 2014 and set out to turn the brand around. Under the new ownership and management Vuarnet reined in brand licensing agreements, focused on French and Italian markets and re-entered the North American market with selective distribution, with an expanded, modernized eyewear range averaging $275 (€220) in price targeting an upper middle class consumer segment. In 2017, the company officially became an Entreprise du Patrimoine Vivant (Living Heritage Company).

In 2023, Vuarnet and its parent company Sporoptic Pouilloux S.A. were acquired by LVMH's eyewear subsidiary Thélios. Vuarnet is one of the last eyewear brands to still produce their own mineral lenses, in Meaux near Paris.

== In popular culture ==
The following actors wore Vuarnet sunglasses in the following movies:

- Alain Delon in the movies La Piscine (1969) and The Girl on a Motorcycle (1968)
- Kurt Russell in the movie The Thing (1982)
- Tom Selleck in the television series Magnum, P.I.
- Jeff Bridges in the movie The Big Lebowski (1998)
- Daniel Craig in the James Bond movies Spectre (2015) and No Time To Die (2021)

Other notable celebrities known for wearing Vuarnet sunglasses are Mick Jagger, Romy Schneider, Huey Lewis, Vincent Cassel and Miles Davis. During the 2025 Sun Valley Conference OpenAI CEO Sam Altman declared "I don’t like smart glasses" while wearing large white-rimmed Vuarnet mountaineering sunglasses.
