= Doina Ciobanu =

London-based creative director, consultant, model, and sustainability advocate

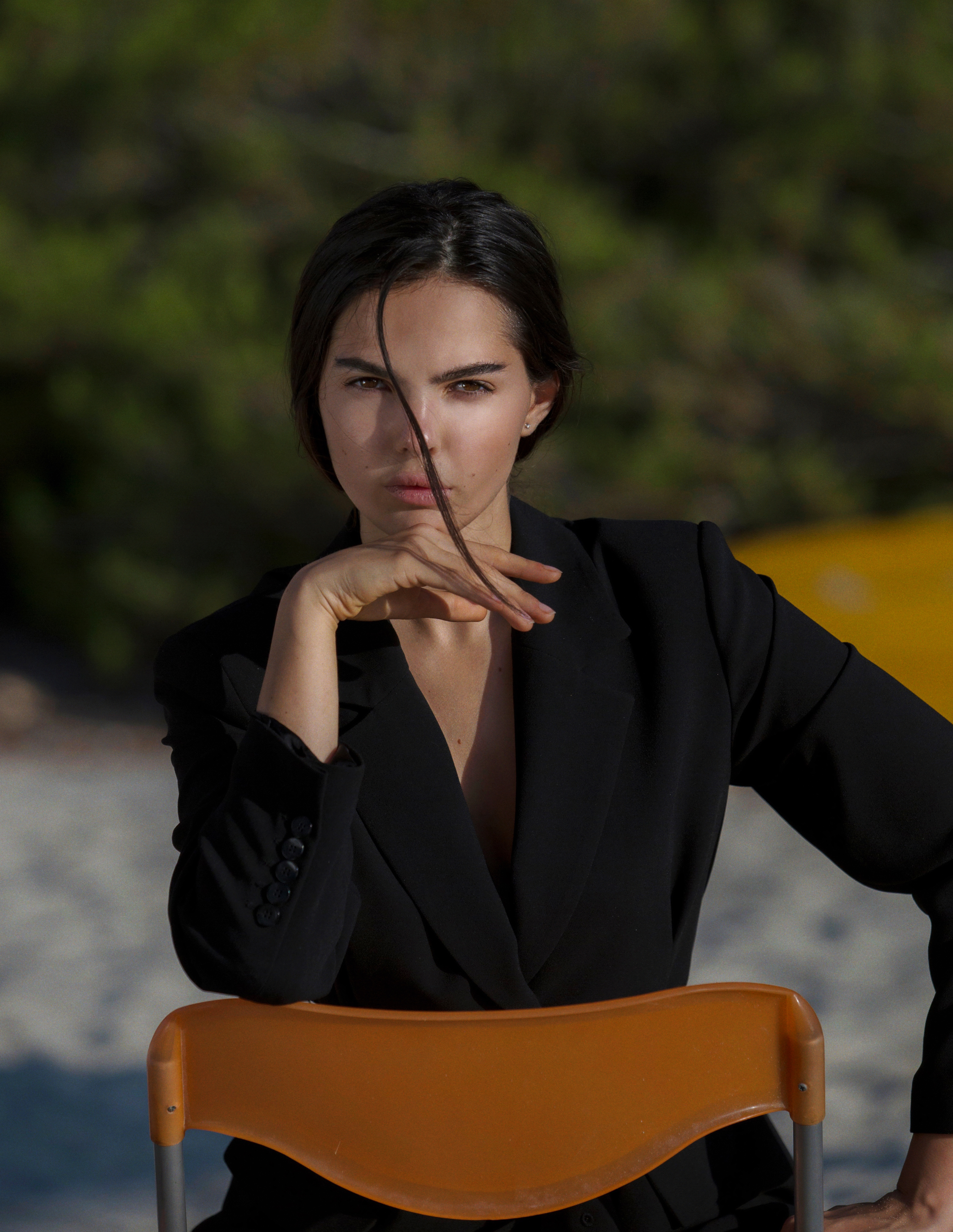
- Born: April 20, 1994 (age 32); Chișinău
- Education: Free International University of Moldova
- Modeling information
- Height: 5 ft 9 in (175 cm)
- Hair color: Naturally Brown
- Eye color: Brown
- Agency: Next Management, The Society Management
- Website: https://doina.co

Doina Ciobanu (Дойна Чобану, born 20 April 1994, Chișinău, Moldova) is a London-based creative director, luxury and creative consultant, and model, active in social and sustainability advocacy. She first gained prominence as a fashion influencer and sustainability advocate, and has been described as having one of the strongest personal brands in the United Kingdom's fashion industry. Ciobanu has modelled and collaborated with luxury fashion houses including Cartier and Dior, and her sustainability advocacy has seen her serve as an ambassador for the No More Plastic foundation and the United Nations Development Programme.

== Professional career ==
Ciobanu launched her fashion blog The Golden Diamonds in 2010 while living in Moldova where she turned down a university placement at the Sorbonne in Paris to pursue a full-time career in fashion.

Moving to London in 2014, she was scouted and signed by Kate Moss' former manager as a digital influencer in the same year, shortly before being signed globally by Next Model Management as both an influencer and fashion model, the first Moldovan to do so and the first digital influencer to be signed by Next's London division. In London she worked beyond her platform on The Golden Diamonds, acting as a correspondent and writer for publications such as Byrdie, CR Fashion Book, Elle and The Guardian, and public speaking at events such as WGSN Futures Awards, the Festival of Marketing, Startup Grind, the UN Circular Fashion Summit, and Web Summit. Her mix of online presence and that of a social-event presence in London soon saw her labeled as a part of "the super blogger legion" and a "mega-blogger".

Her mix of offline and online work saw her recognized by Forbes as both one of the top 19 Young Entrepreneurs and amongst the top 30 Under 30 entrepreneurs of Romania, twice as one of Romania's most influential fashion icons, and twice for 'Best Personal Style' by Elle.

First modeling in Moldova, Ciobanu's management teams transitioned her work to include modeling on a larger scale as of 2015. She subsequently fronted campaigns for luxury brands including Agent Provocateur, Alain Mikli in a campaign that featured upon Times Square billboards, Bulgari, Bobbi Brown, Burberry, Cartier, De Grisogono, Dior, Ermenegildo Zegna, Fendi, L'Oréal, La Perla along with Kendall Jenner as the faces of the lingerie house's Freedom range, Louis Vuitton, Paul Smith, Tom Ford, and Versace, and has featured in works by Rankin.

Her style and, separately, her modeling work have seen her featured in print upon the cover of Elle magazine, and in titles such as Glamour, Harper's Bazaar, Jane, Marie Claire, Tatler, The Telegraph, and international editions of Vogue. Ciobanu has also attracted the attention of men's press, ranking amongst the AskMen's Top 99 women of 2016, being labelled amongst "the most beautiful" bloggers by GQ Mexico, and becoming a regular in the British edition GQ, oft-featured as their 'Hottest Women of the Week' and at their social events.

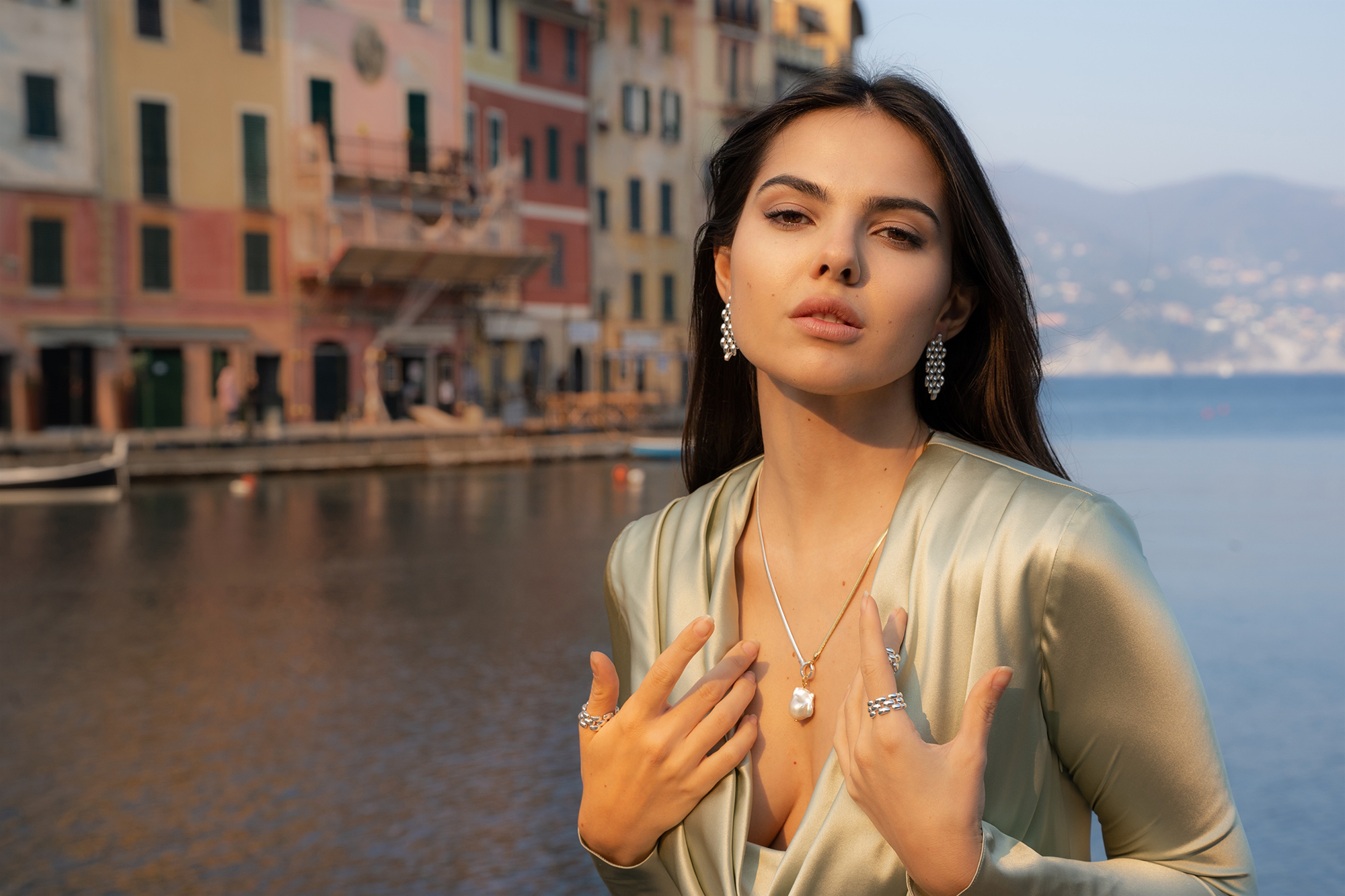
Doina Ciobanu modelling her 2022 recycled-silver collection for British jeweller Monica Vinader

Since 2017, having begun to recognise "moral obligations" that came along with working as an influencer given her personal environmental beliefs were often at odds with many consumption practices driven by social media, Ciobanu has used her platforms to advocate for the fashion industry to become increasingly sustainable. To this end she has accepted ambassadorships for Eco-Age, the No More Plastic foundation and the United Nations Development Programme and went on to study Business Sustainability Management at the University of Cambridge's Institute for Sustainability Leadership. Outside of sustainability focussed speaking engagements, Ciobanu's advocacy for a sustainable fashion industry has led to her being tapped as a judge for both Positive Luxury and The Sustainables Award. She has also served as consultant and designer for a number of fashion brands including Marina Raphael, Monica Vinader, and Wolford.

From August 2020, Ciobanu designed three, eponymous 'Doina' collections for the latter with a focus on utilising 100-percent recycled materials, including recycled silver and gold alongside sustainably sourced pearls. In the same year, Ciobanu designed a sustainable collection of handbags for Marina Raphael, utilising a form of vegan leather that had been developed as a byproduct of the industrial processing of apples.

== Personal life ==
Ciobanu was born in Chișinău, living there until she was 19 before moving to Bucharest and subsequently to London.

Having turned down a position at the University of Paris, Ciobanu corresponded to complete a long-distance bachelor's degree in Political Science and History from the Free International University of Moldova instead. By 2020 she had additionally completed business-focussed 8 weeks-short Online Course, sustainability studies at the University of Cambridge.

Based between London and Milan, she maintains an interest in politics in Moldova and has stated that she would return there to be active in it. Ciobanu speaks English, Romanian and Russian, and is currently learning French and Spanish.
