= Shutter shades =

Type of sunglasses

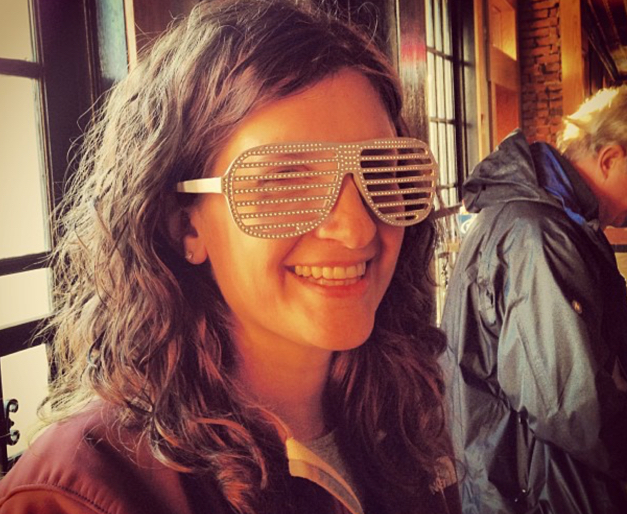
A young woman wearing shutter shades

Shutter shades, also known as slatted shades, louvered shades, or Venetian blind shades are sunglasses that, instead of having darkened lenses, have horizontal slats similar to window shutters, which are an integral part of the frame.

The shades are available in an assortment of styles and colors. Depending on the design, shutter shades may not function as sunglasses; although some models contain UV resistant lenses, many do not. The horizontal plastic "shades" neither provide protection for the eye from UV light nor prevent a substantial amount of light from entering the eye.

== History ==
The first louvered sunglasses date from the 1950s.

A modernized version was released in the early 1980s. Sometimes referred to as "Venetian blinders", examples were featured in the music videos for "Glittering Prize" by Simple Minds in 1982 and "Obsession" by Animotion in 1984. They were also popularized by professional wrestler Macho Man Randy Savage, who wore them before many of his matches, as well as in his promos. Alain Mikli made a contemporary custom design for Kanye West, again influenced by the fashion of the 1980s. West popularized Mikli's design in the music video for "Stronger."

In 2007, Shutter Shades, Inc. released a design, which they also patented, and trademarked the term "Shutter Shades" with the USPTO. However, in 2015 a court in New York ruled that "shutter shades" had become a generic term at least since 2009.
