= Monica Vinader =

British jewelry brand

Monica Vinader Ltd
- Company type: Private
- Industry: Jewellery
- Founded: 2007
- Founder: Monica Vinader
- Headquarters: Holkham, Norfolk, United Kingdom
- Website: monicavinader.com

Monica Vinader Ltd. is a British jewellery brand producing and retailing necklaces, pendants, earrings, rings, and friendship bracelets. It markets itself as crafted demi-fine jewellery positioned and priced in the "gap between fine and fashion jewellery".

== History ==
In 2002, whilst working in Argentina, Monica Vinader, the brand's now-creative director and namesake, began creating bespoke jewelry pieces for private clients. Envisaging an opportunity larger than what bespoke commissions could offer, Vinader would relocate to the United Kingdom by 2007 and, in the same year, formally launching the eponymous company with her sister Gabriela Vinader as co-founder. With demand and sales growing, the company won Retail Jewellers' "Jewellery Brand of the Year" award two years after it was founded. By 2014, it was projected that sales would surpass £14 million in jewelry, up 85% on the previous year.

Profitable from 2009, the company secured funding from London-based venture capital firm Beringea in 2010, using it to open their first store on London's South Molton Street. A second round of funding followed in May 2013, with the company raising a further £1.5M from Beringea and a separate £1M from the Clark Group. Beringea invested an additional £1.5M, and the Clark Group invested £1M as part of the deal. Monica Vinader have launched their Esencia Collection and opened a new store at Canary Wharf. Since 2016 Catherine, Duchess of Cambridge has been noted by fashion websites for wearing a pair of onyx Monica Vinader earrings many times.

== Collaborations ==
Since 2019, Monica Vinader has released collaborative collections with various designers, including editor Caroline Issa and sustainable fashion advocate Doina Ciobanu. Ciobanu's three collections in 2020 and 2021 featured recycled silver and gold alongside sustainably sourced pearls. A collaboration with Florence St. George is planned to introduce the brand's first homeware collection.

== Market positioning and products ==
Monica Vinader is credited with pioneering the "demi-fine" jewelry category, a market segment positioned between mass-market fashion accessories and high-end investment jewelry. This segment typically utilizes 18k gold vermeil (a thick layer of gold over sterling silver) and semi-precious gemstones to offer a luxury aesthetic at a more accessible price point.

The brand's products emphasize "everyday luxury" and personalization, specifically through stacking rings and engravable friendship bracelets. In 2023, the brand reported that overall sales had surpassed £100 million following its majority acquisition by Bridgepoint Development Capital.

== Sustainability and traceability ==
Since 2020, the company has transitioned to using 100% recycled silver and gold in its collections. In 2022, it launched a "Product Passport" initiative, utilizing blockchain technology to allow consumers to trace the origin and sustainability credentials of individual pieces from design to packaging. The brand was named "Responsible Luxury Business of the Year" at the 2025 Positive Luxury Awards.
