= Francine Battaglia =

American computational fluid dynamicist

- Education: University of Buffalo (BS, MS); Pennsylvania State University (PhD)
- Scientific career
- Fields: mechanical engineering
- Workplaces: Iowa State University; Virginia Tech; University of Buffalo; National Institute of Standards and Technology
- Thesis: Numerical Simulations of Instabilities and Asymmetric Characteristics for Suddenly Expanded Channel Flows (1997)
- Doctoral advisor: Anil Kulkarni

Francine Battaglia is an American mechanical engineer specializing in computational fluid dynamics, including the study of fluidized beds and of fire, fire whirls, and flame spread. Her other research interests include ventilation and energy usage in architectural design, and alternative and renewable energy systems. She is professor and chair in the Department of Mechanical and Aerospace Engineering of the University at Buffalo, where she directs the Advanced Simulations for Computing Energy Transport (ASCENT) Laboratory.

== Education ==
Battaglia studied mechanical engineering at the University at Buffalo, graduating in 1991 and continuing there for a master's degree in aerospace engineering in 1992. She completed her Ph.D. in mechanical engineering at Pennsylvania State University in 1997.

== Career ==
After working as a lecturer at Pennsylvania State University and a postdoctoral mechanical engineering researcher at the National Institute of Standards and Technology, she started her work in academia as an assistant professor at Iowa State University in 1999. She was tenured as an associate professor in 2005, also becoming director of the university's Center for Building Energy Research. She moved to Virginia Tech in 2007, becoming a professor there in 2017. Shortly after which Battaglia got a professor position back at her at her first college, the University at Buffalo. She became the department chair of mechanical and aerospace engineering there in 2020.

Battaglia is the director of the ASCENT Laboratory whose research focuses on fluidization technology and building energy. The fluidization technology includes gasification of coal and biomass, chemical vapor deposition of coat nuclear fuel and bubbling beds to create synthesis gas. Their other research focus, building energy, is on the building codes and the construction of energy efficient residential homes, installing ground coupled heat pumps and air conditioning for gasification process.

She chaired the Fluids Engineering Division of the American Society of Mechanical Engineers (ASME) for 2013. She was editor-in-chief of the ASME Journal of Fluids Engineering from 2017 until 2025.

She was president for the American Society of Thermal and Fluids Engineers (ASTFE) from 2023 to 2025.

== Books ==
Battaglia is coauthor of Designing Spaces for Natural Ventilation: An Architect's Guide (with U. Passe, Taylor & Francis, 2015). She is coeditor of Modeling and Simulation of Turbulent Mixing and Reaction For Power, Energy and Flight (with Livescu, Nouri, and Givi, Springer, 2020).

== Recognition ==
Battaglia was named a Fellow of the ASME in 2009, and a Fellow of ASTFE,"for fundamental contributions to the science and technology of building energy utilization and renewable/alternative energy, and turbulent multiphase and reacting flows; exemplary contributions in research, education and service to the thermal fluids engineering fields; and through distinguished leadership within ASTFE and ASME", in 2019.

She was recognized four times by the ASME Board of Governors for service as the FED Chair in July 2014, the IMECE Program Vice Chair in November 2015, the IMECE Program Chair in November 2016 and the IMECE Conference Chair in November 2017.
