= Alain Mikli =

French-Armenian designer (born 1955)

- Born: Alain Miklitarian; April 1, 1955 (age 70); France
- Occupations: Optician, designer

Alain Mikli (born Alain Miklitarian; 1 April 1955) is a French-Armenian designer of high-end handmade eyeglasses and accessories. Mikli's line features unique colors and shapes, and are a favorite among European celebrities and avant-garde Americans. Mikli claims his use of color is inspired by his Lebanese Armenian heritage.

== Career ==
In 1978, Mikli opened his design studio in Paris. By 1983, celebrities like Elton John helped bring the line recognition by wearing and touting Mikli products. Kanye West wore Alain Mikli sunglasses in his music video, Stronger, which he specifically requested from the designer. This style of sunglasses has become a wide phenomenon, usually being referred to as "shutter shades". As of 2000, Mikli's firm employed 220 people with sales of approx. FF220 million. Around 500,000 pairs of Mikli glasses have been sold worldwide.

He co-founded the Hugo Desnoyer restaurants in 2015 with the butcher Hugo Desnoyer, but broke the partnership in 2017 to continue alone to develop a fine meat business.

In 2009, Mikli acquired 75% of Vuarnet.

On 23 January 2013, Alain Mikli International was bought by Italian eyewear giant Luxottica for around 90 million euros.

In 2024, he relaunched his eyewear business with the opening of an optics store in Paris.
