= Carlo Battaglia =

Italian artist (1933–2005)

Carlo Battaglia (28 January 1933 – 17 January 2005) was an Italian artist born from Sardinia.

Born in La Maddalena, Battaglia grew up in Genoa until 1943, but returned to La Maddalena until 1947. He studied stage design at the Accademia di Belle Arti di Roma, studying under Toti Scialoja, and graduated with a thesis on Jackson Pollock in 1957.

Battaglia served in the Italian Air Force from 1958 to 1959, and in 1962 moved to Paris. In 1967, he lived in New York City, where he established friendships with Reinhardt, Motherwell and Rothko.

In 1970, 1978 and 1980, he was invited to the Venice Biennale, exhibiting his series about Maree ("Tides") for the first time in 1970, which introduced a theme that would be prominent throughout his life. Battaglia's most prominent exhibitions include retrospectives at Palazzo Grassi, in Venice in 1967, Palazzo dei Diamanti in Ferrara in 1976 and the Kunsthalle Düsseldorf in 1978.

He also participated in a number of group shows about Italian contemporary art held in many international venues, including the Hirshhorn Museum in Washington in 1974, the Museum Boijmans Van Beuningen in Rotterdam in 1977 and the Hayward Gallery in London in 1978. In 1978 and 1980, he participated to the 40th and the 43rd Venice Biennale. From 1980 on, he increasingly isolated himself and painted in total solitude.

Battaglia died on 17 January 2005.
