= Sara Battaglia =

Italian fashion designer

- Born: 30 April 1987 (age 39); Gioia Tauro (RC)
- Occupation: Fashion designer
- Relatives: Giovanna Battaglia Engelbert (sister)

Sara Battaglia (born 30 April 1987) is a fashion designer and the founder of the Sara Battaglia fashion label.

== Career ==
After graduating in Arts at the Brera Academy, the designer moved from Milan to Florence and then Paris, until she decided to establish her atelier back in Milan.

Sara Battaglia started to design handbags and then expanded to a ready-to-wear label.

In the recent years, Sara Battaglia collaborated with international fashion brands like Salvatore Ferragamo and Frame. In 2022, she partnered with Marina Rinaldi on the creation of a capsule collection (Absolutely Flawless).

Sara Battaglia collections are presented during the Milan Fashion Week.

== Aesthetic ==
Battaglia is mostly renowned for the use of vibrant colors combined with a sharp tailoring, and offers the modern women with revised 50s and 60s looks. She takes inspiration from Slim Aarons, Ettore Sottsass, and Jean Prouvè.

== Awards ==
| Year | Title |
|---|---|
| 2018 | "Best Emerging Brand" for the Fashion category in Italy by the Altagamma Foundation |
| June 2018 | "The Next 100 Italy" in a special issue of MF Fashion magazine |

== Personal life ==
Battaglia grew up in a creative family in Milan: her mother has been teaching sculpture at the Brera Fine Arts Academy for several years. Her siblings also are involved in the arts and fashion business. Indeed, her sister is the Creative Director Giovanna Battaglia Engelbert, her older brother Antonio is a gallerist and her younger brother Luigi is a set designer.

Battaglia currently lives in Milan.
