= Miguel Battaglia =

Italian-Brazilian tailor and football chairman

First President of Corinthians
- In office 1910–1910
- Succeeded by: Alexandre Magnani

Michelle Battaglia (?? ?? ?? Italy — ?? ?? ?? São Paulo), known as Miguel Battaglia, was an Italian-Brazilian tailor and football chairman, being the founder and first president of the Brazilian football club Corinthians. Under his leadership, the club won the Campeonato Paulista in 1914.

Preceded by incumbent	President of Corinthians; 1910	Succeeded by Alexandre Magnani
