= Domenico Battaglia (painter) =

Italian painter

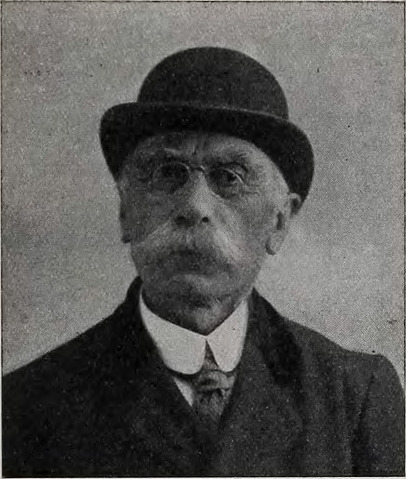
- Born: 18 May 1842
- Died: 1904 (aged 61–62)
- Occupation: Painter

Domenico Battaglia (Naples, 1842 – Naples, 1904) was an Italian painter, mainly of interior vedute.

== Biography ==
He was a member of the Neapolitan School of Posillipo. He studied at the Royal Institute of Fine Arts in Naples, and later became an honorary professor. He obtained various medals at Exhibitions including a medal of great merit for his work displayed at the World Exposition of Vienna, where he submitted the painting: After Prayer. Other paintings include Inside the choir of San Severino in Naples; Interior of Sacristy of San Martino in Naples, awarded a prize in Parma; and another Interior of Choir of San Severino, Un coretto ; Carmine Giordano, exhibited in Paris; Pergolesi and the Stabat Mater exhibited in London, and a Winter Forest.
