= Battaglini =

Battaglini is an Italian surname. Notable people with the surname include:

- Francesco Battaglini (1823–1892), Italian cardinal
- Giuseppe Battaglini (1826–1894), Italian mathematician
- Marco Battaglini (1645–1717), Italian jurist and priest

== See also ==
- 8155 Battaglini, a main-belt asteroid
