= Giovanna Battaglia Engelbert =

Italian fashion editor

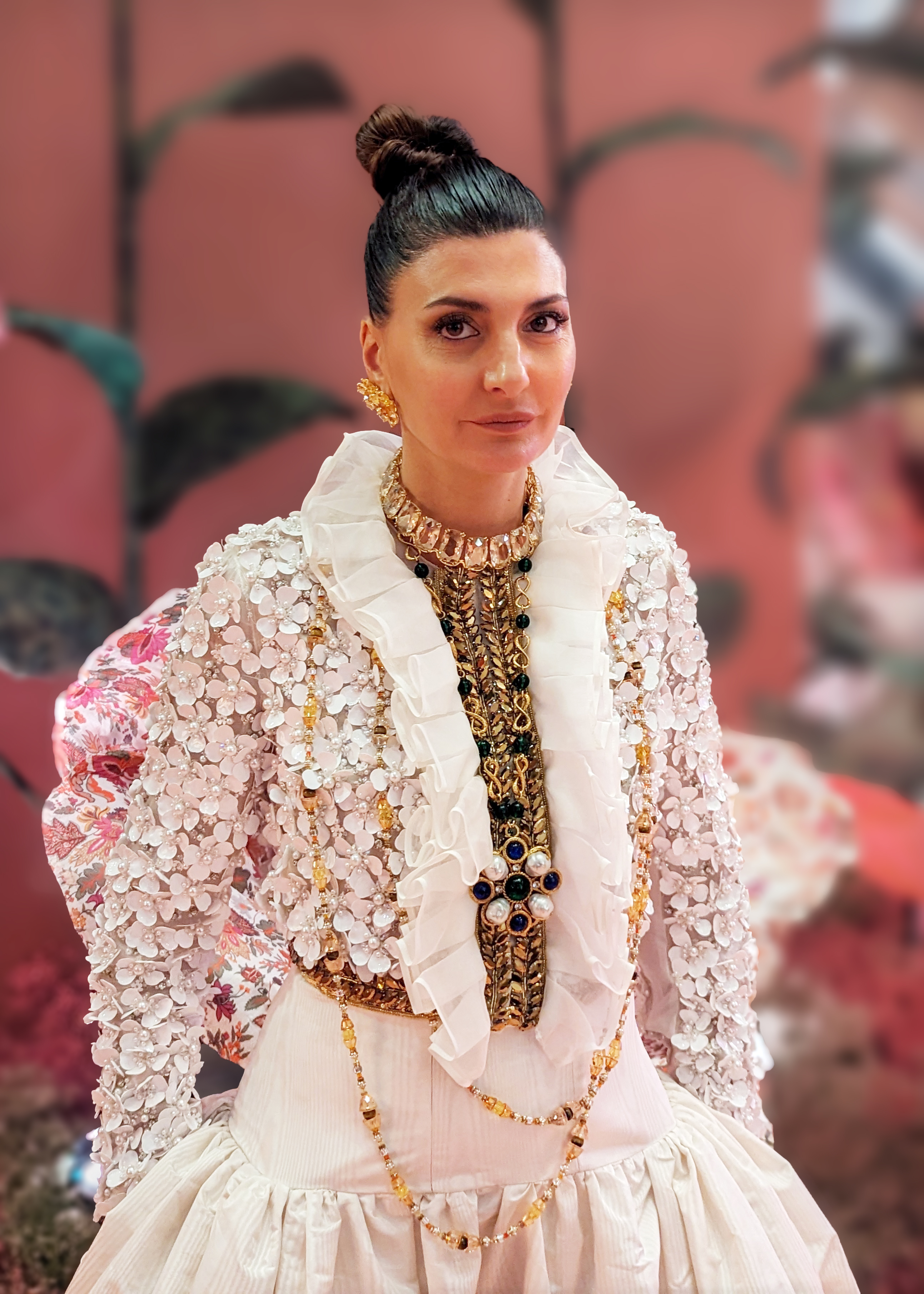
- Engelbert at the Nita Mukesh Ambani Cultural Centre opening in April 2023
- Born: Giovanna Battaglia; 26 September 1979 (age 47); Milan, Italy
- Education: Brera Academy
- Occupations: Fashion editor, creative director
- Spouse: Oscar Engelbert
- Children: Talitha Italia Engelbert
- Relatives: Sara Battaglia

Giovanna Battaglia Engelbert (born Giovanna Battaglia on 26 September 1979) is an Italian fashion businesswoman, stylist, editor and former model. She is the Global Creative Director of Swarovski Group.

Engelbert was born in Milan and studied there at the Brera Fine Arts Academy, where her mother, an artist, teaches sculpture. She began modelling for Dolce & Gabbana when she was in her late teens, but left catwalk modelling to pursue a career in styling. She worked as a stylist for fashion magazine Pig and was later taken on by Anna Dello Russo, then Vogue's fashion editor at the time. Engelbert worked under famed editor Franca Sozzani at Italian Vogue before the two worked together running Vogue Gioiello and Vogue Pelle.

As a stylist, Engelbert has collaborated on editorials with photographers including Peter Lindberg, Patrick Demarchelier, Paolo Roversi and Mario Sorrenti. Engelbert has also worked as a stylist for numerous global fashion brands, including Carolina Herrera, Michael Kors and Dolce & Gabbana.

In 2011, Engelbert moved to New York to work for fashion magazine W; she gained a following as a street style icon after she was photographed for Scott Schuman's new blog The Sartorialist. As a creative director, Engelbert has worked on immersive theatre production Queen of the Night at The Diamond Horseshoe as well as a series of campaign videos for Tory Burch.

From 2016, Engelbert began working with glass producer and jeweller Swarovski as a creative director of the company's B2B division. In this same period, Engelbert also launched two book titles for the company, the first, the Swarovski Book of Dreams Vol I, in September 2018 with a second volume of the title published in February 2019. She had similarly authored a book focussed on her work within the fashion industry, 2017's Gio_graphy: Fun in The Wild World of Fashion. In 2020, Engelbert would be further promoted and named as the Global Creative Director of Swarovski Group, the first so-named person in the company's 125-year history. Her influence throughout the company broadened, she would oversee a changed brand identity and the relaunch of 27 separate Swarovski boutiques globally. Engelbert has also hired Marina Raphael to design and develop the company's first handbag line. The first of Engelbert's own collections for the Austrian company to be released in her new, expanded role, named Collection One, was launched in February 2021; Engelbert described it as having been inspired by both her personal style and archival designs by Swarovski founder Daniel Swarovski. Her second collection, Collection II, was released in September of the same year drawing on the Austrian Arts and Crafts movement.

== Personal life ==
In 2016, she married Oscar Engelbert, a property developer, in Capri. In 2019, the couple had a daughter, Talitha Italia Engelbert. The family lives in Stockholm. She also has another daughter, Elvira Engelbert, who was born in 2006 before the couple wed. In September 2024, her husband's property empire in Stockholm crumbled, and also Oscar Engelbert's private holding company filed for bankruptcy.

Engelbert has four siblings including designer Sara Battaglia.
