= Fortunes of War =

Fortunes of War may refer to:

- Fortunes of War (novel series), a 1960 series by Olivia Manning
- Fortunes of War (TV series), a 1987 television adaptation of the above
- Fortunes of War (film) a 1994 action film produced by and starring Matt Salinger
- "Fortunes of War", a song by heavy metal band Iron Maiden from their 1995 album The X Factor
- "Fortunes of War", a song by prog rock singer Fish from his 1994 album Suits
