= List of Guggenheim Fellowships awarded in 1977 =

Three hundred and thirteen artists, and scientists received Guggenheim Fellowships in 1977. $4,602,000 was disbursed between the recipients, who were chosen from an applicant pool of 3,050. University of California, Berkeley had the most winners on its faculty (16), with University of California, Los Angeles (12) coming second. The University of California system had 44 fellowships total among its faculty. Michael Zuckerman from the University of Pennsylvania declined his award.

== 1977 United States and Canadian fellows ==
Category	Field of Study	Fellow	Institutional association	Research topic	Notes	Ref
Creative Arts	Choreography	Erick Hawkins		Choreography		
Creative Arts	Choreography	Bella Lewitzky-Reynolds	Bella Lewitzky Dance Company	New show		
Creative Arts	Choreography	Kathryn Posin	Kathryn Posin Dance Company	New show featuring an original score		
Creative Arts	Drama & Performance Art	Thomas Babe	New York Shakespeare Festival (in residence)	Playwriting		
Creative Arts	Drama & Performance Art	Charles Fuller		Playwriting		
Creative Arts	Drama & Performance Art	Israel Horovitz		Playwriting		
Creative Arts	Drama & Performance Art	Crispin Larangeira	New York Shakespeare Festival (in residence)	Writing an opera		
Creative Arts	Drama & Performance Art	Megan Terry	Magic Theatre (in residence)	Playwriting		
Creative Arts	Drama & Performance Art	Derek A. Walcott		Playwriting		
Creative Arts	Fiction	Ann Beattie	University of Virginia	Writing short stories		
Creative Arts	Fiction	Leslie Epstein	Queens College CUNY	Writing		
Creative Arts	Fiction	Richard Ford		Writing		
Creative Arts	Fiction	Jay Neugeboren	University of Massachusetts Amherst	Novel: The Stolen Jew		
Creative Arts	Fiction	Craig Nova		Writing		
Creative Arts	Fiction	Jonathan Penner	Southern Illinois University Carbondale	Writing		
Creative Arts	Fiction	Alice Walker	Yale University	Writing		
Creative Arts	Fiction	Sylvia Jean Wilkinson		Work on fifth novel		
Creative Arts	Fiction	Geoffrey Wolff		Writing	Also won in 1972	
Creative Arts	Film	Stan Brakhage	School of the Art Institute of Chicago	Filmmaking		
Creative Arts	Film	Linda Feferman	Bard College	Filmmaking		
Creative Arts	Film	Henry Gabay		Filmmaking		
Creative Arts	Film	George Griffin		Filmmaking		
Creative Arts	Film	Jonas Mekas		Filmmaking		
Creative Arts	Film	Phill Niblock	College of Staten Island	"Celluloid series of portraits of persons"		
Creative Arts	Film	Richard P. Rogers	SUNY Purchase	Film about money's impact on the lives of individuals		
Creative Arts	Film	Jon Rubin	Massachusetts Institute of Technology	Filmmaking		
Creative Arts	Fine Arts	Charles Arthur Arnoldi		Painting		
Creative Arts	Fine Arts	Frances Barth	Princeton University	Painting		
Creative Arts	Fine Arts	Joan Brown	UC Berkeley	Painting		
Creative Arts	Fine Arts	James W. Buchman		Sculpture		
Creative Arts	Fine Arts	John Chamberlain		Sculpture	Also won in 1966	
Creative Arts	Fine Arts	Nassos Daphnis		Painting		
Creative Arts	Fine Arts	Daniel Edge		Sculpture		
Creative Arts	Fine Arts	Llyn Foulkes		Painting		
Creative Arts	Fine Arts	Gordon Hart		Painting		
Creative Arts	Fine Arts	Mary Heilmann		Painting		
Creative Arts	Fine Arts	Robert Hudson		Sculpture		
Creative Arts	Fine Arts	Miyoko Ito		Painting		
Creative Arts	Fine Arts	Aristodimos Kaldis		Painting	Also won in 1975	
Creative Arts	Fine Arts	Gordon Matta-Clark		Environmental sculpture		
Creative Arts	Fine Arts	Mark Prent		Sculpture		
Creative Arts	Fine Arts	Omar Rayo		Printmaking		
Creative Arts	Fine Arts	Marlene Scott	Rochester Institute of Technology	Sculpture		
Creative Arts	Fine Arts	Susan Weil		Painting		
Creative Arts	Music Composition	Lucia Dlugoszewski		Composing		
Creative Arts	Music Composition	Primous Fountain		Composing	Also won in 1974	
Creative Arts	Music Composition	John Harbison	Massachusetts Institute of Technology	Two commissioned works: a piano concerto and a piece for chamber ensemble		
Creative Arts	Music Composition	Sydney Hodkinson	Eastman School of Music	Composing		
Creative Arts	Music Composition	Richard Hoffmann	Oberlin Conservatory	Composing		
Creative Arts	Music Composition	Raoul Pleskow	Long Island University	Composing		
Creative Arts	Music Composition	Shulamit Ran	University of Chicago	Composing		
Creative Arts	Music Composition	Robert Leigh Selig		Composing	Also won in 1971	
Creative Arts	Music Composition	Joan Tower	Bard College	Composing		
Creative Arts	Music Composition	Chinary Ung		Composing		
Creative Arts	Music Composition	Mary Lou Williams		Composing	Also won in 1972	
Creative Arts	Music Composition	Olly W. Wilson	UC Berkeley	Composing	Also won in 1971	
Creative Arts	Music Composition	Maurice Wright	Columbia University	Composing		
Creative Arts	Photography	Claudia Andujar		Yanomami tribe	Also won in 1971	
Creative Arts	Photography	Jerry Dantzic	Long Island University	Panoramic photography	Also won in 1981	
Creative Arts	Photography	Lee Friedlander			Also won in 1960 and 1962	
Creative Arts	Photography	Mark Goodman		Young people of Millerton, New York		
Creative Arts	Photography	John Gutmann	San Francisco State University	Review of his earlier works for the “visual use of language and popular emblems in American life during the 1930s and 1940s”		
Creative Arts	Photography	Sandy Hume	University of Colorado	"Anachronisms: A Geopolitical Survey"		
Creative Arts	Photography	Tod Papageorge		Central Park (Passing Through Eden)	Also won in 1970	
Creative Arts	Photography	Sylvia Plachy	Village Voice			
Creative Arts	Photography	Edward Ranney				
Creative Arts	Photography	Jerry L. Thompson	Yale University			
Creative Arts	Poetry	Joseph Brodsky	University of Michigan	Writing		
Creative Arts	Poetry	Norman Dubie	Arizona State University	Writing		
Creative Arts	Poetry	William Heyen	SUNY Brockport	Writing		
Creative Arts	Poetry	Richard Hugo	University of Montana	Book of poetry set in Scotland		
Creative Arts	Poetry	James McMichael	UC Irvine	Book-length poem		
Creative Arts	Poetry	Robert Mezey	Pomona College (visiting)	Writing		
Creative Arts	Poetry	Gregory Orr	University of Virginia	Writing		
Creative Arts	Poetry	David St. John	Oberlin College	Study in England and France		
Creative Arts	Video & Audio	Nam June Paik		Video art		
Creative Arts	Video & Audio	Ira Schneider	UC San Diego	Time Zones video installation		
Humanities	American Literature	Joel Conarroe	University of Pennsylvania	Cultural and critical study of five modern American poets		
Humanities	American Literature	Albert J. Gelpi	Stanford University	American poetic renaissance, 1910-1930		
Humanities	American Literature	Giles B. Gunn	University of North Carolina	Moral message found in the writings of 20th-century American critics		
Humanities	American Literature	Bruce M. Johnson	University of Rochester	American literature and art in the 19th and 20th centuries		
Humanities	American Literature	Edwin H. Miller	New York University	Nathaniel Hawthorne	Also won in 1967	
Humanities	American Literature	Larzer Ziff	University of Oxford			
Humanities	Architecture, Planning, and Design	Barbara Miller Lane	Bryn Mawr College			
Humanities	Architecture, Planning, and Design	Charles W. Moore	UCLA			
Humanities	Architecture, Planning, and Design	Martin Wachs	UCLA			
Humanities	Biography	Ved Mehta	The New Yorker	Studies on a 19th- and 20th-century Indian family	Also won in 1971	
Humanities	Biography	Nancy Milford		Edna St. Vincent Millay		
Humanities	Biography	Jean Strouse			Also won in 1985	
Humanities	British History	Seymour Drescher	University of Pittsburgh	Abolition of the slave trade in western Europe		
Humanities	British History	Henry Horwitz	University of Iowa	Changes in economic behavior and social attitudes of London merchants in the century before the Industrial Revolution		
Humanities	Classics	Jerzy Linderski	University of Oregon	Constitutional history of ancient Rome, particularly the electoral system		
Humanities	Classics	Gregory Nagy	Harvard University			
Humanities	Classics	Martin Ostwald	University of Pennsylvania	Ancient Greek political institutions		
Humanities	Classics	Ronald S. Stroud	UC Berkeley	History and topography of ancient Corinth		
Humanities	East Asian Studies	Robert P. Goldman	UC Berkeley	Genesis of the epic form in India		
Humanities	East Asian Studies	Patrick D. Hanan	Harvard University			
Humanities	East Asian Studies	Earl Miner	Princeton University	Comparative poetics, Western and Japanese		
Humanities	Economic History	Robert Brenner	UCLA			
Humanities	English Literature	Lillian D. Bloom	Rhode Island College			
Humanities	English Literature	Gerald Chapman	University of Denver			
Humanities	English Literature	Alistair M. Duckworth	University of Florida	Role of estate improvements in 18th-century literature		
Humanities	English Literature	Paul Fussell	Rutgers University	Literary status of travel writing		
Humanities	English Literature	Michael P. Goldman	Princeton University	Acting and action in Shakespearean tragedy		
Humanities	English Literature	Martin Burgess Green	Tufts University		Also won in 1974	
Humanities	English Literature	Phyllis M. Grosskurth	University of Toronto		Also won in 1982	
Humanities	English Literature	Diane Johnson	UC Davis	Critical biography of John Ruskin		
Humanities	English Literature	E. D. H. Johnson	Princeton University	British subject painting from Hogarth to Sickert		
Humanities	English Literature	Michael Millgate	University of Toronto			
Humanities	English Literature	Jason P. Rosenblatt	Georgetown University	Conflicting traditions in Paradise Lost		
Humanities	English Literature	Ann Saddlemyer	University of Toronto	Theory of comedy	Also won in 1965	
Humanities	English Literature	Elaine C. Showalter	University of Delaware (visiting)	Conventions and poetics of madness in Victorian literature		
Humanities	English Literature	Donald D. Stone	Queens College CUNY	Romantic impulse in Victorian fiction		
Humanities	English Literature	George W. Williams	Duke University	New variorum edition of Shakespeare's Henry V		
Humanities	English Literature	Alex Zwerdling	UC Berkeley	Satire and social criticism in the Bloomsbury Group		
Humanities	Fine Arts Research	Blanche R. Brown	New York University	Art of the early Hellenistic period		
Humanities	Fine Arts Research	Samuel Y. Edgerton Jr.	Boston University	Influence of Renaissance art on the scientific revolution		
Humanities	Fine Arts Research	Robert D. Harbison				
Humanities	Fine Arts Research	Inga Karetnikova				
Humanities	Fine Arts Research	Donald B. Kuspit	University of North Carolina	Social and ethical purpose of modern art		
Humanities	Fine Arts Research	Joseph D. Masheck	Barnard College	Iconography of recent American art		
Humanities	Fine Arts Research	Thomas F. Mathews	New York University	Iconographical and exegetical study of a 14th-century Armenian gospel		
Humanities	Fine Arts Research	Daniel J. Robbins	Yale University	Cubist movement		
Humanities	Folklore & Popular Culture	George G. Carey	University of Massachusetts Amherst	Maritime folk culture in New England		
Humanities	French History	Geoffrey W. Symcox	UCLA			
Humanities	French History	Piotr S. Wandycz	Yale University	Twilight of the French eastern alliances, 1926-1936		
Humanities	French Literature	Hazel E. Barnes	University of Colorado			
Humanities	French Literature	Jacques Garelli		Poetic and theatrical world of Artaud		
Humanities	French Literature	Linda Orr	Yale University	French literature and historiography of the 19th century		
Humanities	French Literature	Michel Riffaterre	Columbia University	Grammar of descriptive poetry	Also won in 1961	
Humanities	French Literature	Francis Steegmuller		Translation of Flaubert's letters		
Humanities	General Nonfiction	Robert L. Allen	The Black Scholar	Port Chicago disaster		
Humanities	General Nonfiction	Ann Cornelisen				
Humanities	General Nonfiction	Charles Neider		Science, technology, and human values in Antarctica		
Humanities	General Nonfiction	Peter S. Prescott	Newsweek	Juvenile justice in New York City courts		
Humanities	German & East European History	Vojtech Mastny	University of Illinois	History of post-World War II political culture in Eastern Europe		
Humanities	German & Scandinavian Literature	Walter W. Arndt	Dartmouth College	Wilhelm Busch		
Humanities	German & Scandinavian Literature	Stanley Corngold	Princeton University	Aesthetic consciousness in modern German literature and poetic theory		
Humanities	History of Science & Technology	Josef Eisinger	Bell Laboratories	Societal and biochemical aspects of environmental lead poisoning		
Humanities	History of Science & Technology	David C. Lindberg	University of Wisconsin, Madison	Roger Bacon's philosophy of nature		
Humanities	Iberian & Latin American History	Friedrich Katz	University of Chicago	Pancho Villa and the Mexican Revolution		
Humanities	Iberian & Latin American History	James Lockhart	UCLA			
Humanities	Iberian & Latin American History	Mary Elizabeth Smith	University of New Mexico			
Humanities	Italian History	Benjamin F. Brown IV				
Humanities	Italian Literature	M. J. B. Allen	UCLA	Ficini's commentary on Plato's Phaedrus		
Humanities	Linguistics	Sheila E. Blumstein	Brown University			
Humanities	Linguistics	Joseph E. Emonds	UCLA			
Humanities	Linguistics	Susumu Kuno	Harvard University			
Humanities	Linguistics	David M. Perlmutter	University of Pennsylvania			
Humanities	Linguistics	John Robert Ross	Massachusetts Institute of Technology			
Humanities	Literary Criticism	Robert Scholes	Brown University	Semiotics of Fiction		
Humanities	Literary Criticism	Barbara Herrnstein Smith	University of Pennsylvania	Literary and aethetic value and evaluation		
Humanities	Medieval History	Edwin B. DeWindt	University of Detroit			
Humanities	Medieval History	John Hine Mundy	Columbia University	Urban layout and planning in medieval Europe	Also won in 1963	
Humanities	Medieval History	Ronald G. Witt	Duke University	Rhetorical tradition in 13th and 14th-century France and Italy		
Humanities	Medieval Literature	E. Talbot Donaldson	Indiana University Bloomington	Shakespeare's responses to Chaucer	Also won in 1951	
Humanities	Medieval Literature	Robert E. Kaske	Cornell University	Sources and methodology for the interpretation of medieval imagery	Also won in 1961	
Humanities	Music Research	Richard Crawford	University of Michigan	American psalmody and sacred music		
Humanities	Music Research	Lewis H. Lockwood	Princeton University	Music in Renaissance Ferrara		
Humanities	Music Research	Rose R. Subotnik	University of Chicago			
Humanities	Near Eastern Studies	Jacob Milgrom	UC Berkeley	Legal and exegetical principles of the Temple Scroll		
Humanities	Philosophy	Tyler Burge	UCLA			
Humanities	Philosophy	Saul Kripke	Princeton University (visiting)	Nature of logic and truth	Also won in 1968	
Humanities	Philosophy	Benson Mates	UC Berkeley	Philosophical skepticism		
Humanities	Philosophy	Herbert Morris	UCLA			
Humanities	Philosophy	John Rawls	Harvard University		Also won in 1964	
Humanities	Philosophy	Nicholas P. White	University of Michigan			
Humanities	Philosophy	Margaret Dauler Wilson	Princeton University	Locke's position on the knowledge of matter and mind		
Humanities	Religion	George W. E. Nickelsburg	University of Iowa	New translation of the Book of Enoch and critical commentary on the compositions		
Humanities	Religion	Paul Ramsey	Princeton University	Edition of The Ethical Writings of Jonathan Edwards		
Humanities	Religion	Alan F. Segal	Princeton University	History of Judaism and early Christianity		
Humanities	Renaissance History	Steven Ozment	Yale University	Intellectual and religious history of the Reformation, 1250-1650		
Humanities	Renaissance History	David C. Steinmetz	Harvard Divinity School (visiting)	Intellectual origins of the Protestant Reform		
Humanities	Slavic Literature	Simon Karlinsky	UC Berkeley	Survey of Russian drama as literature	Also won in 1969	
Humanities	Spanish & Portuguese Literature	María Soledad Carrasco	Hunter College and CUNY Graduate Center	Spanish Moorish ballad of the 16th and 17th centuries		
Humanities	Spanish & Portuguese Literature	Isaías Lerner	City University of New York	Annotated edition of Pedro Mexía's Silva de varia lección		
Humanities	Spanish & Portuguese Literature	Joseph H. Silverman	UC Santa Cruz	Various projects that are part of a Judeo-Spanish series		
Humanities	Theatre Arts	Herbert Blau	University of Maryland		Also won in 1962	
Humanities	Theatre Arts	Lee Breuer	Mabou Mines Theater Company	Development of a collaborative aesthetic and method of staging and performing nondramatic material		
Humanities	Theatre Arts	Michael E. Feingold	Village Voice	Study of American playwriting, 1960-1975		
Humanities	Theatre Arts	Julius Novick	SUNY Purchase	History of American theater, 1945-1975		
Humanities	United States History	David Cressy	Pitzer College			
Humanities	United States History	John P. Demos	Brandeis University			
Humanities	United States History	Peter Gay	Yale University	Consensus, confrontation, and anxiety in Germany, 1871-1914	Also won in 1966	
Humanities	United States History	William H. Goetzmann	University of Texas	US and the "Second Great Age of Discovery"		
Humanities	United States History	Michael B. Katz	York University			
Humanities	United States History	Edward Pessen	Baruch College	Social mobility in American history		
Humanities	United States History	William Stott	University of Texas	Cultural history of America, 1935-1965		
Humanities	United States History	Hans L. Trefousse	Brooklyn College	Carl Schurz		
Humanities	United States History	Robert V. Wells	Union College	Impact of population on American history		
Natural Sciences	Applied Mathematics	Arthur M. Jaffe	Harvard University	Mathematical physics	Also won in 1991	
Natural Sciences	Applied Mathematics	Alan Needleman	Brown University			
Natural Sciences	Applied Mathematics	David Okrent	UCLA		Also won in 1961	
Natural Sciences	Applied Mathematics	Sol I. Rubinow	Cornell University	Mathematical biology		
Natural Sciences	Astronomy-Astrophysics	Alan H. Barrett	Massachusetts Institute of Technology	Molecular properties of interstellar space		
Natural Sciences	Astronomy-Astrophysics	John Cooper	University of Colorado, Boulder			
Natural Sciences	Astronomy-Astrophysics	Martin V. Goldman	University of Colorado, Boulder			
Natural Sciences	Astronomy-Astrophysics	Norman R. Lebovitz	University of Chicago	Applied mathematics and astrophysics		
Natural Sciences	Astronomy-Astrophysics	Pedro E. Zadunaisky		Numerical methods of dynamical system	Also won in 1956	
Natural Sciences	Astronomy-Astrophysics	David T. Wilkinson	Princeton University	Observational cosmology		
Natural Sciences	Chemistry	Jack G. Calvert	Ohio State University			
Natural Sciences	Chemistry	James P. Collman	Stanford University	Organometallic chemistry	Also won in 1985	
Natural Sciences	Chemistry	Charles H. DePuy	University of Colorado		Also won in 1986	
Natural Sciences	Chemistry	Richard Eisenberg	University of Rochester	Organometallic chemistry		
Natural Sciences	Chemistry	Sidney M. Hecht	Massachusetts Institute of Technology			
Natural Sciences	Chemistry	John A. Katzenellenbogen	University of Illinois	Cancer biochemistry		
Natural Sciences	Chemistry	Edward M. Kosower	Tel-Aviv University and SUNY Stony Brook	Biophysical organic chemistry		
Natural Sciences	Chemistry	Alvin L. Kwiram	University of Washington			
Natural Sciences	Chemistry	William P. Reinhardt	University of Colorado, Boulder			
Natural Sciences	Chemistry	Nicholas Winograd	Purdue University	Surface chemistry		
Natural Sciences	Computer Science	Robert G. Gallager	Massachusetts Institute of Technology			
Natural Sciences	Computer Science	William K. Pratt	University of Southern California	Use of computers in industrial automation		
Natural Sciences	Earth Science	Harold C. Helgeson	UC Berkeley	Geochemical processes		
Natural Sciences	Earth Science	Farish A. Jenkins	Harvard University			
Natural Sciences	Earth Science	Cornelis Klein Jr.	Indiana University Bloomington	Iron formations in northwestern Australia's desert region		
Natural Sciences	Earth Science	Joseph Pedlosky	University of Chicago	Research at the Woods Hole Oceanographic Institution		
Natural Sciences	Earth Science	Paul G. Richards	Columbia University	Theoretical seismology		
Natural Sciences	Engineering	Carolyn M. Preece	Bell Laboratories	Physical metallurgy		
Natural Sciences	Mathematics	W. W. Boone	University of Illinois	Decision problems in group theory	Also won in 1957	
Natural Sciences	Mathematics	Shoshichi Kobayashi	UC Berkeley	Differential geometry and function theory of complex manifolds		
Natural Sciences	Mathematics	Paul E. Schupp	University of Illinois	Theory of infinite group		
Natural Sciences	Mathematics	Gabriel Stolzenberg	Northeastern University	Constructivist critique of contemporary mathematics		
Natural Sciences	Mathematics	Jean François Treves	Rutgers University	Linear partial differential equations		
Natural Sciences	Medicine & Health	Rex L. Jamison	Stanford University	Renal physiology		
Natural Sciences	Medicine & Health	Nicholas A. Kefalides	University of Pennsylvania	Basement membrane chemistry and collagen synthesis		
Natural Sciences	Medicine & Health	Donald G. Walker	Johns Hopkins University			
Natural Sciences	Medicine & Health	David B. Werner	Hesperian Foundation	Community-based rural healthcare in Latin America		
Natural Sciences	Molecular & Cellular Biology	John C. Gerhart	UC Berkeley	Developmental biology		
Natural Sciences	Molecular & Cellular Biology	O. Hayes Griffith	University of Oregon	Photoelectron microscopy		
Natural Sciences	Molecular & Cellular Biology	J. Lawrence Katz	Rensselaer Polytechnic Institute	Structural bases for the mechanical properties of bone		
Natural Sciences	Molecular & Cellular Biology	Harvey F. Lodish	Massachusetts Institute of Technology			
Natural Sciences	Molecular & Cellular Biology	Brian W. Matthews	University of Oregon	Structure of protein molecules and on protein crystallography		
Natural Sciences	Molecular & Cellular Biology	Jesse C. Rabinowitz	UC Berkeley	Protein synthesis		
Natural Sciences	Molecular & Cellular Biology	Jacqueline A. Reynolds	Duke University Medical Center	Membrane-bound proteins		
Natural Sciences	Molecular & Cellular Biology	Eli Sercarz	UCLA		Also won in 1970	
Natural Sciences	Molecular & Cellular Biology	James A. Spudich	UC San Francisco			
Natural Sciences	Molecular & Cellular Biology	Christopher J. Wills	UC San Diego	Protein chemistry and evolution		
Natural Sciences	Neuroscience	Peter Dallos	Northwestern University			
Natural Sciences	Neuroscience	Robert K. Josephson	UC Irvine	Performance and structure of "fast" muscles in the Australian cicada		
Natural Sciences	Neuroscience	Allan W. Snyder	Australian National University	Visual neurobiology		
Natural Sciences	Organismic Biology & Ecology	Francisco J. Ayala	UC Davis	Philosophy of biology		
Natural Sciences	Organismic Biology & Ecology	Guy L. Bush	University of Texas	Modes of speciation in mammals		
Natural Sciences	Organismic Biology & Ecology	Carl Gans	University of Michigan		Also won in 1953	
Natural Sciences	Organismic Biology & Ecology	Peter W. Hochachka	University of British Columbia			
Natural Sciences	Organismic Biology & Ecology	William W. Murdoch	UC Santa Barbara	Predator-prey insect relationships		
Natural Sciences	Organismic Biology & Ecology	Peter W. Price	University of Illinois	Evolutionary biology of parasites		
Natural Sciences	Physics	Samuel M. Berman	Stanford University	Energy technology and public policy		
Natural Sciences	Physics	D. Allan Bromley	Yale University	Nuclear physics		
Natural Sciences	Physics	John Clarke	UC Berkeley	Solid-state physics		
Natural Sciences	Physics	J. Bruce French	University of Rochester	Nuclear physics		
Natural Sciences	Physics	Sven R. Hartmann	Columbia University	Nonlinear optics		
Natural Sciences	Physics	Roman Jackiw	Massachusetts Institute of Technology			
Natural Sciences	Physics	William L. McMillan	University of Illinois	Basic concepts in the theory of condensed matter		
Natural Sciences	Physics	Yoichiro Nambu	University of Chicago		Also won in 1971	
Natural Sciences	Physics	Geoffrey King Walters	Rice University	Atomic, molecular, and solid surface physics		
Natural Sciences	Physics	Robert Lee White	Stanford University	Physiology and psychobiology of hearing	Also won in 1969	
Natural Sciences	Physics	Roland Winston	University of Chicago			
Natural Sciences	Plant Sciences	Michael G. Barbour	UC Davis	Ecology of plants in coastal ecosystems		
Natural Sciences	Plant Sciences	Warren L. Butler	UC San Diego			
Natural Sciences	Plant Sciences	Gerald E. Edwards	University of Wisconsin, Madison			
Natural Sciences	Plant Sciences	Richard Alden Howard	Arnold Arboretum	Book volumes on flora		
Natural Sciences	Plant Sciences	Joseph S. Semancik	UC Riverside	Mechanism of tumor growth in plant cells, particularly the "tumor-inducing principal"		
Natural Sciences	Plant Sciences	Paul H. Williams	University of Wisconsin, Madison			
Natural Sciences	Statistics	James O. Berger	Purdue University	Statistical decision theory		
Natural Sciences	Statistics	Shelby J. Haberman	University of Chicago	Analysis of qualitative data		
Natural Sciences	Statistics	Donald B. Rubin	Educational Testing Service	Mathematical statistics		
Social Sciences	Anthropology & Cultural Studies	F. G. Bailey	UC San Diego			
Social Sciences	Anthropology & Cultural Studies	Michael Dorris	Dartmouth College	Historical and social implications of the Alaska Native Claims Settlement Act		
Social Sciences	Anthropology & Cultural Studies	Gary Hamilton Gossen	UC Santa Cruz	Fieldwork in Chamula with an emphasis on oral history		
Social Sciences	Anthropology & Cultural Studies	Constance Perin				
Social Sciences	Economics	Carlo M. Cipolla	UC Berkeley	Development of public health in late Renaissance Italy		
Social Sciences	Economics	Mordecai Kurz	Stanford University	Altruism as an outcome of social interaction		
Social Sciences	Economics	Richard D. Portes	University of London	Research at Harvard University		
Social Sciences	Economics	Karl Shell	University of Pennsylvania	Economic theory		
Social Sciences	Economics	David A. Starrett	Stanford University	Location theory		
Social Sciences	Economics	Oliver E. Williamson	University of Pennsylvania	Comparative studies in industrial organization		
Social Sciences	Education	Roland S. Barth	Harvard University	Education and school leadership		
Social Sciences	Education	Carl F. Kaestle	University of Wisconsin, Madison			
Social Sciences	Education	Diane S. Ravitch	Columbia University	History of American education, 1946-1976		
Social Sciences	Geography & Environmental Studies	William M. Denevan	University of Wisconsin, Madison			
Social Sciences	Geography & Environmental Studies	Arthur H. Robinson	University of Wisconsin, Madison		Also won in 1964	
Social Sciences	Geography & Environmental Studies	David Woodward	Newberry Library			
Social Sciences	Law	Francis A. Allen	University of Michigan		Also won in 1971	
Social Sciences	Law	William B. Gould	Stanford University	Comparative study of labor law in the US and Japan		
Social Sciences	Law	Richard S. Harris		Lawyers and the law in America		
Social Sciences	Law	Wayne R. LaFave	University of Illinois	Judicial decisions on the Fourth Amendment		
Social Sciences	Law	Michael Meltsner	Columbia University School of Law	Relationships between lawyers and their clients, other lawyers, and the legal system		
Social Sciences	Political Science	Michael Les Benedict	Ohio State University			
Social Sciences	Political Science	Bruce Bueno de Mesquita	University of Rochester	Rational choice theory of war decisions		
Social Sciences	Political Science	M. Kent Jennings	University of Michigan	Life cycle and political participation		
Social Sciences	Political Science	Paul E. Peterson	University of Chicago			
Social Sciences	Political Science	Nelson W. Polsby	UC Berkeley	Political sociology	Also won in 1985	
Social Sciences	Political Science	Philippe C. Schmitter	University of Chicago			
Social Sciences	Political Science	Donald D. Searing	University of North Carolina	Compilation into book form of over 600 interviews with British politicians		
Social Sciences	Political Science	Martin M. Shapiro	UC San Diego			
Social Sciences	Political Science	Ezra N. Suleiman	UCLA			
Social Sciences	Political Science	Merwin Crawford Young	University of Wisconsin, Madison			
Social Sciences	Psychology	Richard J. Herrnstein	Harvard University			
Social Sciences	Psychology	Frank Restle	Indiana University Bloomington	Mathematical psychology		
Social Sciences	Psychology	Paul Rozin	University of Pennsylvania	Nature of human food habits		
Social Sciences	Psychology	Jeffrey Z. Rubin	Tufts University			
Social Sciences	Sociology	Dane Archer	UC Santa Cruz	International approach to the social origins of homicide		
Social Sciences	Sociology	David Caplovitz	City University of New York	Impact of inflation and recession on American families		
Social Sciences	Sociology	Herbert J. Gans	Columbia University	Public policy for culture		
Social Sciences	Sociology	Erving Goffman	University of Pennsylvania	Casino gambling		
Social Sciences	Sociology	Alex Inkeles	Stanford University	Individual modernity		
Social Sciences	Sociology	David Mechanic	University of Wisconsin, Madison	Controlling costs of medical care		
Social Sciences	Sociology	John Shelton Reed	University of North Carolina	Sociology of religion		

== 1976 Latin American and Caribbean Fellows ==
Category	Field of Study	Fellow	Institutional association	Research topic	Notes	Ref
Creative Arts	Fiction	José Agustín Ramírez Gómez		Writing		
Creative Arts	Fiction	Mauricio Wacquez		Writing		
Creative Arts	Fine Arts	Rafael Ferrer	Philadelphia College of Art	Environmental art		
Creative Arts	Fine Arts	Leopoldo M. Maler		Visual art		
Creative Arts	Music Composition	Francisco Kröpfl		Composing		
Creative Arts	Poetry	Francisco Cervantes		Writing		
Humanities	Architecture, Planning, and Design	Guillermo Geisse Grove	University of Chile			
Humanities	Fine Arts Research	Aracy A. Amaral	University of São Paulo	International and national influences on the art of Brazil, 1930-1975		
Humanities	General Nonfiction	Enrique Andrés Lihn	University of Chile			
Humanities	Iberian & Latin American History	Juan Antonio Oddone	Universidad Autónoma Metropolitana			
Humanities	Iberian & Latin American History	Félix Weinberg	Universidad Nacional del Sur			
Humanities	Linguistics	Beatriz Rosario Lavandera		Sociolinguistics		
Humanities	Literary Criticism	Robert Schwarz		Analytic study of the later works of Machado de Assis		
Humanities	Music Research	María Ester Grebe Vicuña	Universidad de Chile		Also won in 1964	
Natural Sciences	Astronomy-Astrophysics	Fernando Raúl Colomb	CONICET	Galactic astronomy		
Natural Sciences	Medicine & Health	Guillermo Jaim-Etcheverry	Universidad de Buenos Aires and CONICET	Neurobiology		
Natural Sciences	Medicine & Health	Carlos Alfredo Mautalen		Clinical studies in the field of calcium and phosphorus metabolism		
Natural Sciences	Medicine & Health	Víctor E. Nahmod		Biochemistry of the brain		
Natural Sciences	Molecular & Cellular Biology	Ruben Adler		Cell contacts and cell interactions during neural differentiation		
Natural Sciences	Molecular & Cellular Biology	Alberto Boveris	CONICET			
Natural Sciences	Molecular & Cellular Biology	Giuseppe Cilento		Molecular chemical physics	Also won in 1981	
Natural Sciences	Molecular & Cellular Biology	Manuel O. Diaz Rivara		Cytogenetics and molecular biology		
Natural Sciences	Physics	Lesser Blum	University of Puerto Rico	Physical chemistry		
Natural Sciences	Physics	Cylon E. Gonçalves da Silva	State University of Campinas	Solid-state physics		
Natural Sciences	Plant Sciences	Enrique Forero	National University of Colombia	Monographic studies of tropical plants		
Social Sciences	Anthropology & Cultural Studies	Jorge A. Flores Ochoa		Cosmology and symbolism of the pastoralists of the high Andes		

== See also ==
- Guggenheim Fellowship
- List of Guggenheim Fellowships awarded in 1976
- List of Guggenheim Fellowships awarded in 1978
