= Barbara J. Garrison =

American chemist

Barbara Jane Garrison
- Born: March 7, 1949 (age 77)
- Education: Purdue University; Camelback High School; Arizona State University
- Spouse: Nicholas Winograd
- Scientific career
- Fields: Computational chemistry, surface science
- Workplaces: Pennsylvania State University; Purdue University; University of California, Berkeley
- Thesis: Cooling of interstellar formaldehyde by collison with helium : an accurate quantum mechanical calculation. (1975)

Barbara Jane Garrison (born March 7, 1949) is an American chemist who is emeritus professor at Pennsylvania State University. She is the former Shapiro Professor of Chemistry and head of the department. She is a Fellow of the American Physical Society, American Chemical Society, American Association for the Advancement of Science and American Vacuum Society.

== Early life and education ==
Garrison was born in Big Rapids, Michigan. Her father, "Gary" Garrison, was a medic during World War II. Upon returning to the United States, he studied at Ferris State University, the first in his family to attend college. Her mother grew up in Missouri. In 1956, the Garrison family moved to Phoenix, Arizona. She was encouraged by her father to work on maths and physics. As a teenager, Garrison played clarinet in the marching band, and was involved with the Girl Scouts of the USA. She attended Camelback High School, where she eventually decided to focus on physics. She graduated as one of the top five students in the class, and was awarded a scholarship to attend the Arizona State University. She majored in physics and maths, but took her quantum mechanics classes in chemistry. After graduating, she moved to the University of California, Berkeley, where she realized she was interested in the physics of molecules. She transferred her speciality to chemistry, and worked on Penning ionization. During her graduate degree, she started to work with IBM in San Jose on molecular modeling. After graduating, Garrison joined Purdue University.

== Research and career ==
Garrison moved to the Lawrence Berkeley National Laboratory, where she used a super computer to perform basic molecular dynamics simulations. In 1979, she moved to Pennsylvania State University, where IBM provided her with a mainframe for computational calculations. She was particularly interested in simulating the sputtering process. Garrison was interested in surface structures and the emission of organic molecules. She started a collaboration that saw her simulating ablative photodecomposition.

== Awards and honors ==
- 1984 Peter Mark Award
- 1990 Penn State Faculty Scholar Award for Outstanding Achievement in Physical Sciences and Engineering
- 1990 Akron Section Award
- 1994 Francis P. Garvan-John M. Olin Medal from the American Chemical Society
- 1994 Elected Fellow of the American Physical Society
- 1994 Elected Fellow of the American Vacuum Society
- 2004 Eberly College of Science Distinguished Alumni Service Award
- 2009 Elected Fellow of the American Association for the Advancement of Science
- 2010 Honored in festschrift issue of the Journal of Physical Chemistry C
- 2010 Elected Fellow of the American Chemical Society
- 2015 American Vacuum Society Theodore E. Madey Award

== Selected publications ==
- Zhigilei, Leonid V.; Garrison, Barbara J. (2000). "Microscopic mechanisms of laser ablation of organic solids in the thermal and stress confinement irradiation regimes". Journal of Applied Physics. 88 (3): 1281–1298. Bibcode:2000JAP....88.1281Z. doi:10.1063/1.373816. ISSN 0021-8979.
- Garrison, Barbara J.; Srinivasan, R. (1985-04-15). "Laser ablation of organic polymers: Microscopic models for photochemical and thermal processes". Journal of Applied Physics. 57 (8): 2909–2914. Bibcode:1985JAP....57.2909G. doi:10.1063/1.335230. ISSN 0021-8979.
- Zhigilei, L. V.; Kodali, P. B. S.; Garrison, B. J. (1997-10-01). "Molecular Dynamics Model for Laser Ablation and Desorption of Organic Solids". The Journal of Physical Chemistry B. 101 (42): 8624. doi:10.1021/jp972527c. ISSN 1520-6106.

== Personal life ==
Garrison was married on April 19, 1978.
