= The Great Fortune =

Novel by Olivia Manning

- Cover of the first UK edition
- Author: Olivia Manning
- Language: English
- Genre: Historical fiction
- Publisher: Heinemann
- Publication date: 1960
- Publication place: Great Britain
- Media type: Print
- Pages: 296 pp
- ISBN: 0-09-941572-0

The Great Fortune is a novel by English writer Olivia Manning first published in 1960. It forms the opening part of a six-part novel series called Fortunes Of War. The Fortunes Of War series itself is split into two trilogies, The Balkan Trilogy and The Levant Trilogy. The novels tell an unfolding story of how the Second World War impacts on the lives of a group of British expatriates.

The Great Fortune covers the first year of the war from September 1939 to June 1940, and is set in Romania. It is semi-autobiographical, mirroring the life of Olivia Manning during those years, but uses fictional characters.

The work was praised by critics for its perception and for an adept and scrupulous attention to detail, seen in its vivid descriptions of people, places, and the natural world.

== Plot summary ==
The novel opens with an English couple, Guy and Harriet Pringle, travelling through Yugoslavia towards Romania on a train. They have just married, after a whirlwind romance over the summer vacation. They are travelling to Bucharest, where Guy has a job (paid for by the British Council) at the English department of the University.

On the train they first encounter Prince Yakimov, a once-wealthy English-educated White Russian émigré who is now nearly penniless and forced to live by scrounging.

Once in Bucharest they set up a temporary home in the Atheni hotel where all the British journalists congregate in what is known as the English bar. They witness the arrival of the last remnants of the defeated Polish army, vanquished in the German invasion of Poland. In a piece of luck, Yakimov is hired as an assistant to work for a veteran journalist, Mcann, who has been wounded in the retreat and is desperate to get his story out. This enables Yakimov to live in the hotel in great style, where he befriends the Pringles.

Guy shows Harriet the sights of Bucharest, especially the cafes and the Cismigiu Park. She meets Sophie – a half-Jewish student of Guy, seeking the security of a passport – whom Harriet senses is a rival for Guy's affections.

Harriet meets Professor Inchcape and two other members of the University English department, Clarence Lawson and diplomat Foxy Leverat. She also meets some junior members of the British diplomatic legation. All seem relatively unconcerned by the war and the threat it poses.

They are entertained by the Druckers, a family of Jewish bankers who enjoy extreme wealth, and whose eldest son Sacha is a student of Guy.

The Pringles rent an underheated two-bedroom apartment in a block overlooking the Cotroceni Royal Palace just as winter begins.

Yakimov's credit runs out and he is forced to rent a room in an unfashionable bug-ridden suburban apartment. The head of the Drucker family is arrested on trumped-up charges, and the rest of his family flee.

Harriet is shocked as she witnesses the extreme poverty that exists alongside the wealthy affluence of the capital. The suffering endured by the poor during the very severe Romanian winter is described.

The novel follows the course of the historical events of 1939 and 1940 and how these successively affect the English community in Bucharest and Romanian society.

These are:

- The fall of Poland
- The assassination of the prime minister Armand Călinescu by the Iron Guard, the Romanian fascist movement
- The Russo-Finnish war
- The invasion of Denmark and Norway by Germany
- The invasion of the Low Countries by Germany
- The coup that replaced Prime Minister Gheorghe Argeșanu with Constantin Argetoianu.
- The fall of France and the Dunkirk evacuation of British troops.
- The entry of Italy into the war on the side of Germany.

News of these events reaches the main characters by rumor, newspaper, German propaganda, and via BBC radio. Harriet's friendship with Clarence deepens as Guy becomes absorbed in his university work. Guy's close friend David Boyd arrives from the Middle East.

The final chapters describe the production of the Shakespeare play Troilus and Cressida by the University's English department in the spring of 1940. It is directed by Guy, who becomes entirely focused on the work, ignoring the threatening nature of the war as it unfolds around him. Yakimov surprises everyone, including himself, with a great acting ability, which restores his self-respect. The performance is hailed as a triumph, yet many Romanians question how the British can mount such a cultural spectacle while their nation seems on the brink of military defeat. The play can be seen as an allegory for political events, with the beleaguered city of Troy as Britain and the invading Athenians led by the militaristic Achilles as the fascists.

The book's title, The Great Fortune, is taken from its final pages and refers to the unrealized economic potential of Greater Romania.

== See also ==
- Fortunes of War (TV series)
