= R. D. Smith =

BBC radio producer (1914–1985)

- Born: Reginald Donald Smith; 31 July 1914
- Died: 3 May 1985 (aged 70)
- Education: Birmingham University (BA)
- Occupations: Teacher, lecturer, radio producer
- Spouse: Olivia Manning (m. 1939)

Reginald Donald Smith (31 July 1914 – 3 May 1985) was a British teacher and lecturer, BBC radio producer, and possible communist spy. He was the model for the character of Guy Pringle in the novel sequence Fortunes of War written by his wife, Olivia Manning.

== Early life ==
Smith was born and brought up in the working-class neighbourhood of Aston Manor, Birmingham, the son of a toolmaker, William Smith and his wife Annie Griffiths, who supplemented the family income as a charwoman doing paid housework and cleaning. Reggie, as he was generally known, attended King Edward VI Grammar School, Aston; the family were frequently short of money since his father was often ill; to save expense, Smith never told his parents that he needed glasses for his very short sight. Having read David Copperfield at the age of 12, he determined that he wanted to become "a teacher to share the wonder of such books with others".

Smith went on to Birmingham University, from which he graduated in 1937 with a BA degree with honours in English literature. Smith had a great love of poetry and a phenomenal memory for poems, prose and plays. While at university he founded the Birmingham Socialist Society and met poet Louis MacNeice, at the time an assistant lecturer in classics. He became a lifelong friend.

According to MI5 files, Smith was recruited as a Soviet spy by the art historian Anthony Blunt during a visit to Cambridge in 1938. He commented later: "I think I presented Anthony Blunt with a conundrum: was I rough trade or was I a gent slumming? I think that it went through his mind that I might make good spy material." Smith was unusual material for a spy; ebullient and friendly, he made no secret of his communist beliefs, and friends reported him unable to keep secrets. His flamboyant character and lifestyle was to cause some concern among other spies, who according to MI5 criticised his behaviour as not showing "the stability or competence that should distinguish a party member".

== Romania, Greece, Egypt, Palestine ==
After tackling multiple temporary jobs including actor, postal worker, archaeologist, editor, and teacher, Smith applied for a post with the British Council, and was posted as lecturer in English in Bucharest, Romania in 1938. He returned on leave to the UK in the summer of 1939, and was introduced to the novelist Olivia Manning by the writer Walter Allen. In preparation for the meeting, Smith had read her work. He admired it greatly, and considered it showed "signs of genius"; he was also immediately smitten with its author. A few weeks later, on 18 August 1939, the pair were married at Marylebone registry office, with MacNeice and the poet Stevie Smith as witnesses. Unconventional as ever, the bridegroom failed to produce a wedding ring for the ceremony. Throughout their marriage, Smith strongly supported his wife's writing, encouraging and sustaining her during Manning's frequent despondency and discouragement about her success.

A few days later, Smith and his bride were recalled to Romania, arriving just as Britain declared war on Germany. Smith was exempt from military service due to his work with the British Council, though it is likely that his poor eyesight would have meant failing the required medical. During their 13 months in Romania, Smith and Manning witnessed the approaching war, including the abdication of King Carol and the rise of Fascism. The couple's experiences were to form the basis of the first two novels of the Fortunes of War, The Great Fortune and The Spoilt City. Smith appears in the novel as the central character of Guy Pringle, a large, extroverted, and gregarious communist who pays little attention to his new wife while lavishing attention and time on everybody else. The Smiths participated regularly in the café society, but Manning often went home early, leaving her new husband to expound earnestly but naively on the merits of communism, including how much better Jews would be well treated in a Russian-occupied Romania, and excusing the Soviet pact with Hitler, and the Red Army's invasion of Finland. Just as in the novels, Smith's name was broadcast by the Gestapo as that of a spy.

In October 1940, the couple escaped the rising fascism, fleeing to Athens, Greece. Typically when choosing what to pack, Smith chose his books rather than work suits, which he needed for his ongoing lecturing for the British Council. In April 1941, as the German army neared the Greek capital, they were once again forced to flee, this time to Egypt. After a delay, Smith was once again given a teaching posts by the British Council in October 1941, this time at Farouk University in Alexandria. The pair's time spent in Greece and Egypt formed the foundation for the last four novels of the Fortunes of War.

In September 1942, the couple moved to Jerusalem, where Smith became the controller of programmes of the Palestine Broadcasting Service, later moving to the post of acting deputy postmaster-general for the Palestine government. Subsequently, released MI5 files say that throughout the war, Smith had been secretly working to increase Soviet influence in the countries where he was posted.

== Return to the UK ==
At the end of the war in 1945, Smith returned to the UK, where he was appointed as a radio producer in the BBC features department by Laurence Gilliam. According to features producer Douglas Cleverdon, Gilliam "genially tolerated" Smith's Communist Party membership. In 1947, he was identified by MI5 as a "secret member of the CPGB" (Communist Party of Great Britain) and part of a communist cell at the BBC in 1947, and as a result his movements were followed and his telephone bugged. An MI5 officer noted that "Reggie has paraded his opinions (so) flamboyantly that his friends thought that he was consequently in danger of losing his job." Indeed, as the Cold War developed, fears of a communist in the features department led him to being transferred to the drama department in 1954. Following the Soviet invasion of Hungary, Smith resigned his Communist Party membership. Given a free hand and liberty, Smith flourished as a radio producer, in what is considered a golden period for radio. Important work from his BBC days include The Easter Rising, 1916 (1966) about the Irish uprising, and The Pump (1972), a documentary about a major heart operation. He was a kind, generous and enthusiastic man, well known for finding parts in his productions for anybody who seemed to need one. Harold Pinter and Richard Burton were among those he helped in the early days of their careers. He was also well known for his passionate enthusiasm for chess, cricket and rugby, and he would sometimes disappear from a production midway through the day to attend a match.

Smith continued his socialising ways, spending hours in the pub with seasoned drinkers such as Louis MacNeice, Dylan Thomas, Bob Pocock, and Bertie Rodgers, always in the public bar, never the saloon, due to his Marxist principles. He would often announce that he was "off to the pub" at dinner parties at his own home, sometimes taking a male guest and sometimes not. He was also a considerable womaniser, and had numerous affairs throughout his married life, though neither he nor Manning contemplated divorce.

== Final years ==
Smith took early retirement from the BBC, and in 1973 was appointed professor of liberal and contemporary studies at the New University of Ulster. He held the post until his retirement in 1979, when he was made professor emeritus. Manning refused to move to Ulster, and so the couple were parted for several months of the year. She died in July 1980, and in 1981, Smith married Diana Robson, with whom he had been in a long-term relationship since the 1960s. Smith was visiting professor of literary arts at the University of Surrey from 1979 to 1983, and in 1984, he published a book about the poet Anna Wickham.

Smith died of cirrhosis of the liver on 3 May 1985, aged seventy, at the Royal Free Hospital. A well-liked and highly gregarious man, his funeral and PEN memorial meeting were standing room only.

Guy Pringle, Smith's fictional counterpart, was portrayed by Kenneth Branagh in the 1987 BBC television adaptation of the Fortunes of War.

== Works ==
- The Writings of Anna Wickham: Free Woman and Poet. Edited and introduced by R.D. Smith. London, 1984.
