= Olivia Manning =

British writer and poet (1908–1980)

Olivia Manning CBE
- Manning, c. 1930s
- Born: Olivia Mary Manning; 2 March 1908; Portsmouth, Hampshire, England
- Died: 23 July 1980 (aged 72); Ryde, Isle of Wight, England
- Resting place: Billingham Manor, Chillerton, Isle of Wight
- Occupations: Novelist and poet
- Spouse: R. D. Smith (m. 1939)
- Writing career
- Years active: 1929–1980
- Subjects: War, colonialism, imperialism, displacement, alienation, feminism
- Notable work: Fortunes of War

Olivia Mary Manning CBE (2 March 1908 – 23 July 1980) was a British novelist, poet, writer, and reviewer. Her fiction and non-fiction, frequently detailing journeys and personal odysseys, were principally set in the United Kingdom, Europe, and the Middle East. She often wrote from her personal experience, though her books also demonstrate strengths in imaginative writing. Her books are widely admired for her artistic eye and vivid descriptions of place.

Manning's youth was divided between Portsmouth and Ireland, giving her what she described as "the usual Anglo-Irish sense of belonging nowhere". She attended art school and moved to London, where her first serious novel, The Wind Changes, was published in 1937. In August 1939 she married R. D. Smith ("Reggie"), a British Council lecturer posted in Bucharest, Romania, and subsequently lived in Greece, Egypt, and British Mandatory Palestine as the Nazis overran Eastern Europe. Her experiences formed the basis for her best-known work, the six novels making up The Balkan Trilogy and The Levant Trilogy, known collectively as Fortunes of War. Critics judged her overall output to be of uneven quality, but this series, published between 1960 and 1980, was described by Anthony Burgess as "the finest fictional record of the war produced by a British writer".

Manning returned to London after the war and lived there until her death in 1980; she wrote poetry, short stories, novels, non-fiction, reviews, and drama for the British Broadcasting Corporation. Both Manning and her husband had affairs, but they never contemplated divorce. Her relationships with writers such as Stevie Smith and Iris Murdoch were difficult, as an insecure Manning was envious of their greater success. Her constant grumbling about all manner of subjects is reflected in her nickname, "Olivia Moaning", but her husband R. D. Smith never wavered in his role as his wife's principal supporter and encourager, confident that her talent would ultimately be recognised. As she had feared, real fame only came after her death in 1980, when an adaptation of Fortunes of War was televised in 1987.

Manning's books have received limited critical attention; as during her life, opinions are divided, particularly about her characterisation and portrayal of other cultures. Her works tend to minimise issues of gender and are not easily classified as feminist literature. Nevertheless, recent scholarship has highlighted Manning's importance as a woman writer of war fiction and of the British Empire in decline. Her works are critical of war and racism, and colonialism and imperialism; they examine themes of displacement and physical and emotional alienation.

== Early years ==
Olivia Manning was born in North End, Portsmouth, on 2 March 1908. Her father, Oliver Manning, was a naval officer who rose from naval trainee to lieutenant commander despite a lack of formal schooling. At the age of 45, while visiting the port of Belfast, he met Olivia Morrow, a publican's daughter fourteen years his junior; they married less than a month later in December 1904, in the Presbyterian church in her home town of Bangor, County Down.

Manning adored her womanising father, who entertained others by singing Gilbert and Sullivan and reciting poetry he had memorised during long sea voyages. In contrast, her mother was bossy and domineering, with a "mind as rigid as cast-iron", and there were constant marital disputes. The initially warm relationship between mother and daughter became strained after the birth of Manning's brother Oliver in 1913; delicate and frequently ill, he was the centre of his mother's attention, much to the displeasure of Manning, who made several childish attempts to harm him. This unhappy, insecure childhood left a lasting mark on her work and personality. Manning was educated privately at a small dame school before moving to the north of Ireland in 1916, the first of several extended periods spent there while her father was at sea. In Bangor, she attended Bangor Presbyterian School, and in Portsmouth Lyndon House School developing, as she recalled, "the usual Anglo-Irish sense of belonging nowhere". Schoolmates described her as shy and prone to tantrums; her tendency to tell boastful tall-tales about her family led to ostracism by her peers. Supported by her father, Manning read and wrote extensively, preferring novels, especially those by H. Rider Haggard. Her mother discouraged such pursuits, and confiscated material she thought unsuitable; when she found her daughter reading The Times Literary Supplement she scolded that "young men do not like women who read papers like that", and that Manning should focus on marketable job skills, such as typing.

Indeed, when financial circumstances forced Manning to leave school at sixteen, she worked as a typist and spent some time as a junior in a beauty salon. A talented artist, she took evening classes at the Portsmouth Municipal School of Art, where a fellow student described her as intellectual and aloof. In May 1928, she had a painting selected for an exhibition at Southsea, and was subsequently offered a one-woman show of her works. Manning seemed to be poised for a career as an artist, but she had meanwhile continued her interest in literature, and at the age of twenty determined instead to be a writer. Her artist's eye is apparent in her later intense descriptions of landscapes.

== Early career ==
Manning's first published works were three serialised detective novels, Rose of Rubies, Here is Murder and The Black Scarab which appeared in the Portsmouth News beginning in 1929 under the pseudonym Jacob Morrow. Manning did not acknowledge these books until the 1960s; their publication dates might have given away her age, a secret she kept even from her husband. Between 1929 and 1935 she wrote about 20 short stories, including a ghost story that was the first work to be published under her own name, though using initials to obscure her gender. Manning also wrote two literary novels, neither of which was accepted for publication. Her second manuscript sufficiently impressed Edward Garnett, a literary editor at Jonathan Cape, that he asked his assistant Hamish Miles to write her a note of encouragement. Miles, a well-connected literary adviser and translator in his late thirties, invited Manning to visit if she were ever in London. Manning, feeling stifled in Portsmouth, had already made efforts to move to the capital, but her meeting with Miles made her more determined. She succeeded in obtaining a typing job at the department store Peter Jones, and, despite opposition from her mother, moved into a run-down bed-sit in Chelsea.

Short of food and money, Manning spent long hours writing after work. Miles took Manning under his wing, dazzling her with dinners, literary conversation, and gossip, and providing unaccustomed support. A married man with two children, he told Manning that his wife was an invalid and no longer able to tolerate sex; they soon became lovers. Manning later recalled that "sex for both of them was the motivating charm of life".

A case of mistaken identity involving an artist with a similar name led Manning to a better-paid job antiquing furniture, at which she worked for more than two years, still writing in her spare time. She recalled this as "one of the happiest seasons" of her life. With Miles' encouragement she completed a novel, The Wind Changes, and saw it published by Jonathan Cape in April 1937. The novel, set in Dublin in June 1921 during the Irish War of Independence, revolved around a woman torn between an Irish patriot and an English writer with pro-Republican sympathies. It was well received, with one reviewer commenting that "the novel shows unusual promise". Soon after, Miles learnt that he had an inoperable brain tumour, and disappeared from Manning's life. Since the affair had been kept secret she had difficulty obtaining information about him, and could not afford to visit him in the Edinburgh hospital where he lay dying. She lost her job at Peter Jones, moved to a well-paid job at the Medici Society, but was sacked when she refused her boss's order to give up novel-writing in the evening so as to conserve her energy for the day job. Manning obtained other work assessing new novels for their potential as films for Metro-Goldwyn-Mayer, but by the time she had saved sufficient money for a trip to Edinburgh, Miles was too ill to see her. He died in December 1937.

Miles did not normally introduce his literary friends to each other, but before his death, he had been forced by circumstance to introduce Manning to the poet Stevie Smith. The two developed an immediate rapport and enjoyed exploring London's backstreets, with regular outings to museums, cinema, and visits to the Palmers Green home that Smith shared with an eccentric aunt. According to a mutual friend, Manning found in Smith's home "an atmosphere of security and comfort which must have made her room in Oakley Street seem even chillier and more threadbare". The novelist and critic Walter Allen met Manning in 1937 and observed that she had a "devastating" wit "and was as formidable a young woman as any in London". Manning and Smith, he added, were a malicious pair of snobs.

== Marriage and Romania ==
In July 1939, Walter Allen introduced Manning to the charming Marxist R. D. "Reggie" Smith. Smith was a large, energetic man, possessed of a constant desire for the company of others. The son of a Manchester toolmaker, he had studied at Birmingham University, where he had been coached by the left-wing poet Louis MacNeice and founded the Birmingham Socialist Society. According to the British intelligence organisation MI5, Smith had been recruited as a communist spy by Anthony Blunt on a visit to Cambridge University in 1938.

When he met Manning, Smith was on leave from his British Council position as a lecturer in Romania. He had diligently prepared himself for the introduction to Manning by reading her works, and felt that her book The Wind Changes showed "signs of genius". He described Manning as a jolie laide, possessing lovely hair, hands, eyes, and skin though an overlong nose, and fell in love at first sight. When he borrowed a half-crown from her on their first meeting and repaid it the next day, he knew they would marry. Manning was less certain of the relationship, but Smith quickly moved into her flat, proposing in bed a few weeks later. They were married at Marylebone Registry Office on 18 August 1939, with Stevie Smith and Louis MacNeice as witnesses. The bridegroom, unconventionally yet true to form, did not produce a ring for the ceremony. A few days after the wedding, the couple received word that Smith had been recalled to Bucharest. They left within a matter of hours; Manning later wrote to Stevie Smith from Romania asking her to find out what had happened to their flat and to take care of her books while she was away. The couple travelled by train to Bucharest, arriving on 3 September 1939, the day Britain declared war on Germany. Between the two world wars, Romania had looked to France to guarantee its security against German territorial aspirations. The impact of the Munich Agreement (1938), the German–Soviet Non-Aggression Pact (1939), and the Fall of France (1940) increased German influence and control over the country, and included demands that Romania cede territory and resources. The couple's time in Bucharest coincided with the rise of fascist and totalitarian power within ostensibly neutral Romania, while war threatened from without, driving thousands of refugees within its borders.

The Smiths initially rented a flat, but later moved in with the diplomat Adam Watson, who was working with the British Legation. Those who knew Manning at the time described her as a shy, provincial girl who had little experience with other cultures. She was both dazzled and appalled by Romania. The café society, with its wit and gossip, appealed to her, but she was repelled by the peasantry and the aggressive, often mutilated, beggars. Her Romanian experiences were captured in the first two volumes of The Balkan Trilogy (The Great Fortune and The Spoilt City), considered one of the most important literary treatments of Romania during the war. In her novels, Manning described Bucharest as being on the margins of European civilisation, "a strange, half-Oriental capital" that was "primitive, bug-ridden and brutal", whose citizens were peasants, whatever their wealth or status.

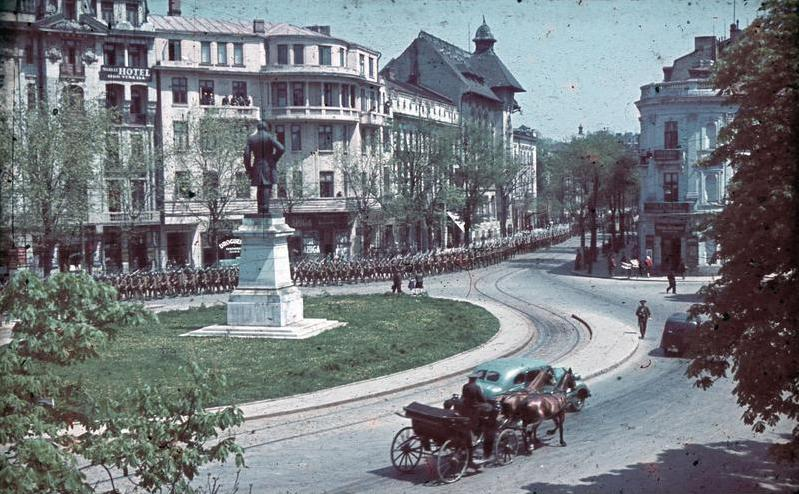
Soldiers marching in Bucharest, 1941

Manning spent her days writing; her main project was a book about Henry Morton Stanley and his search for Emin Pasha, but she also maintained an intimate correspondence with Stevie Smith, which was full of Bloomsbury gossip and intrigue. She undertook a dangerous journalistic assignment to interview the former Romanian Prime Minister Iuliu Maniu in Cluj, Transylvania, at the time full of German troops, and soon to be transferred by Romania to Hungary as part of the Second Vienna Award of August 1940, imposed by the Germans and Italians. Like many of her experiences, the interview was to be incorporated into a future work; others included her impromptu baptism of Smith with cold tea because she feared being separated from him after death, and Smith's production of a Shakespeare play, in which she was promised a prime role that was given to another.

Smith was relentlessly gregarious, and throughout his life, his warmth, wit, and friendliness earned him many friends and drinking companions. In contrast, Manning was reticent and uncomfortable in social settings and remained in the background. She acted, in her own words, as a "camp-follower", trailing after Smith as he went from bar to bar, often choosing to go home early and alone. While Manning remained faithful to Smith during the war, their friend Ivor Porter was to report that Smith had numerous affairs.

The approaching war and rise of fascism and the Iron Guard in Romania disconcerted and frightened Manning. The abdication of King Carol and the advance of the Germans in September 1940 increased her fears, and she repeatedly asked Smith "But where will the Jews go?" Just before German troops entered Romania on 7 October at the invitation of the new dictator Ion Antonescu, Manning flew to Greece, followed a week later by Smith.

== Greece and Egypt ==
Manning was subject to anxieties bordering on paranoia throughout her life. She had good reason to be concerned about Smith, who travelled from Romania to Greece on the German Lufthansa airline – Lufthansa planes were sometimes diverted to Axis countries. He arrived safely, bringing a rucksack, a suitcase full of books, but no appropriate clothes for work. Smith relaunched his hectic social life, but his wife interacted little with the expatriate community, focusing instead on her writing. Nevertheless, this was a happy time for Manning; "Romania is abroad," said Manning, "but Greece is home". Manning had her admirers, including Terence Spencer, a British Council lecturer who acted as her companion while Smith was busy with other activities – he later appeared as the character Charles Warden in Friends and Heroes, the third book of The Balkan Trilogy. Soon after their arrival, Greece entered the war against the Axis.

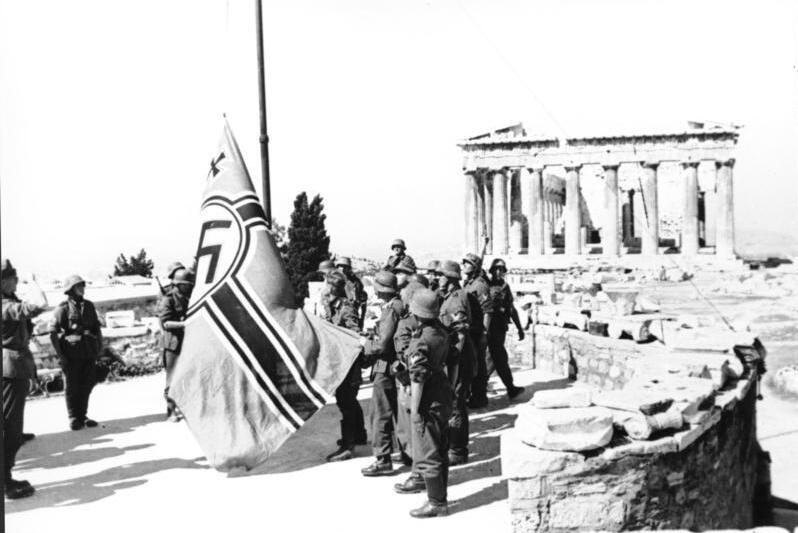
German soldiers raising a Third Reich battle flag on the Acropolis, Athens, 1941

In spite of early successes against invading Italian forces, by April 1941 the country was at risk of invasion from the Germans; in a later poem Manning recalled the "horror and terror of defeat" of a people she had grown to love. The British Council advised its staff to evacuate, and on 18 April Manning and Smith left Piraeus for Egypt on the Erebus, the last civilian ship to leave Greece.

For the three dangerous days of the passage to Alexandria the passengers subsisted on oranges and wine. On board with the Smiths were the novelist Robert Liddell, the Welsh poet Harold Edwards, and their wives– the Smiths shared a cramped cabin with the Edwardses. Mrs. Edwards had brought with her a hat box full of expensive Parisian hats, which Manning kept placing in the passageway outside the cabin, and from whence Mrs. Edwards kept returning it. The two were not on speaking terms by the end of the voyage, but Manning had the last word: when Mrs. Edwards later opened her hatbox she found that Manning had crushed the hats with a chamberpot.

Arriving in Alexandria, the refugees gratefully devoured the food provided by the British military, but learned that the swastika was now flying over the Acropolis. Manning's first impressions of Egypt were of squalor and unreality: "For weeks we lived in a state of recoil". From Alexandria they went by train to Cairo, where they renewed contact with Adam Watson, who was now Second Secretary at the British Embassy. He invited them to stay at his Garden City flat that overlooked the embassy.

Though nominally an independent country, Egypt had been effectively under British control since the late nineteenth century. With the outbreak of war, and under the terms of the Anglo-Egyptian treaty of 1936, the country was under virtual occupation by the British. At this stage in the war, the Germans were advancing apparently unstoppably across the desert towards Egypt, and Cairo was rife with rumours and alarms. Manning was jittery and fearful. She was constantly anxious about illness and was indeed frequently unwell. Concerned, Smith suggested that it might be best if she returned to England, but she retorted "Wherever we go, we go together. If we return home, we both go. I won't have the war separating us. End of story." Her father had made her a firm believer in the British Empire and the benefits it had brought the world, and Manning was a patriotic Briton, confident of ultimate Allied success. In Egypt, she confronted the fact that British occupation had never been popular. Smith quickly discovered the Anglo-Egyptian Union in Zamalek, where he drank and talked politics and poetry. As usual, he was well liked, and according to Lawrence Durrell often had a string of disreputable friends with him. Manning was much less popular. Durrell described her as a "hook-nosed condor", whose critical manner was unappreciated by many who knew her.

Manning was incensed that the British Council did not immediately find a job for Smith, whom she considered one of their most brilliant teachers. She took her revenge by writing scurrilous verse about the council's representative, C. F. A. Dundas, later immortalised as the ineffectual Colin Gracey in Fortunes of War. Manning's characters were often based on real people though she never drew precisely from life. Her mocking portrait of the British Council lecturer Professor Lord Pinkrose was loosely based on Lord Dunsany, sent to occupy the Byron Chair of English at Athens University in 1940. She also resented that Amy Smart, wife of Walter Smart and frequent patron of artists, poets, and writers in Cairo, paid so little attention to her and Smith; she later took revenge in a similar way.

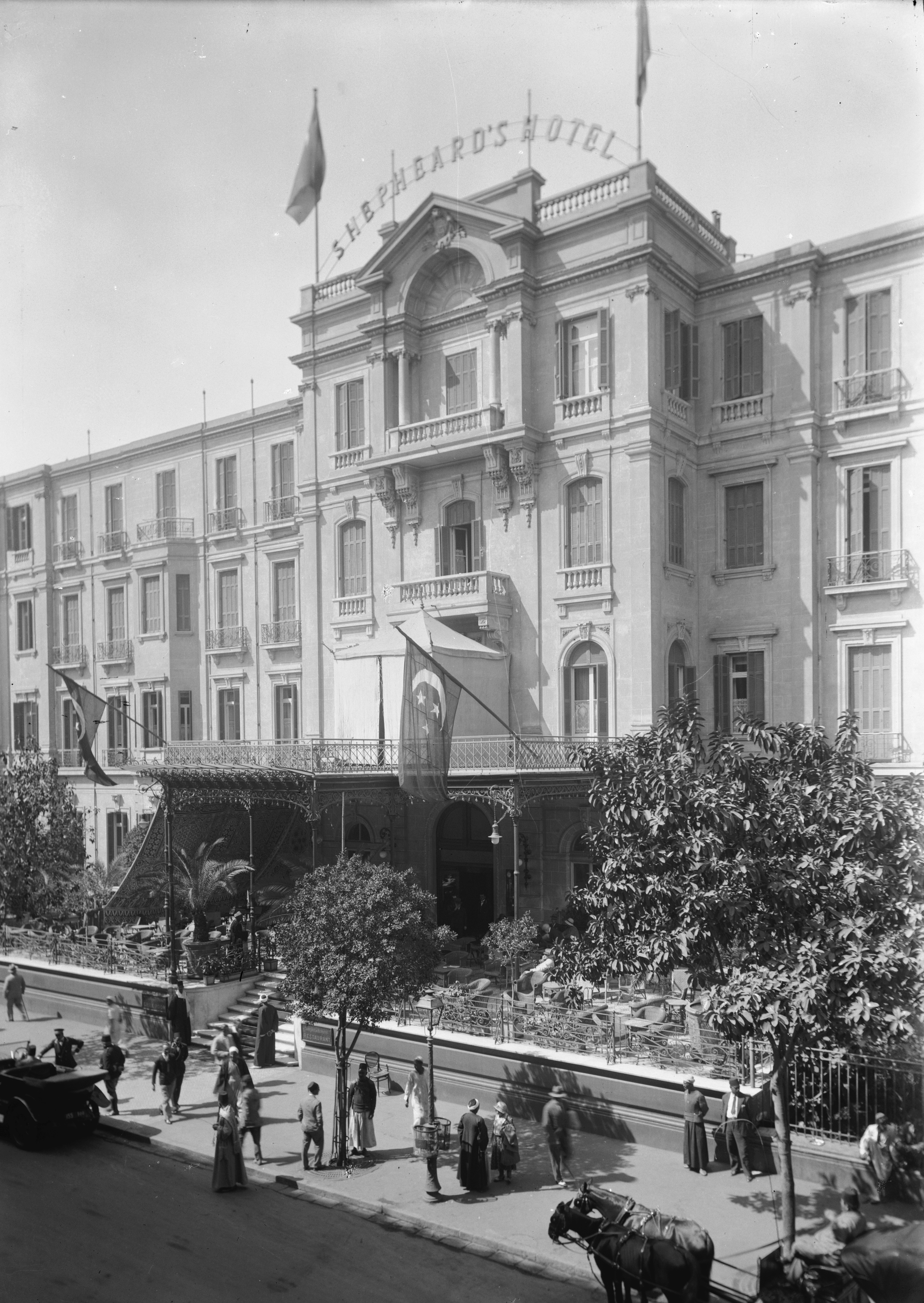
Shepheard's Hotel, Cairo

In October 1941, Smith was offered a post as lecturer at Farouk University in Alexandria. The couple moved from Cairo to share a flat with fellow teacher Robert Liddell. The Germans regularly bombed the city, and the raids terrified Manning, who irritated Smith and Liddell by insisting that all three descend to the air raid shelter whenever the sirens wailed. Almost immediately after her arrival in Alexandria came devastating news of her brother Oliver's death in a plane crash. The emotional upset this caused prevented her from writing novels for several years.

The air raids became intolerable to Manning, and she soon moved back to Cairo, where in late 1941 she became press attaché at the United States Legation. In her spare time, she worked on Guests at the Marriage, an unpublished prototype for The Balkan Trilogy, as well as short stories and poetry, some of which she sent to Stevie Smith in the hopes of getting them published. Over the years, Stevie had brooded over Manning's desertion of their friendship to marry Reggie Smith, and around this time Stevie's jealousy took an overt form; in 1942 she wrote a poem entitled "Murder", in which a man stands beside a grave and admits, "My hand brought Reggie Smith to this strait bed – / Well, fare his soul well, fear not I the dead". In subsequent reprintings, the name "Reggie Smith" was replaced by "Filmer Smith", veiling the allusion, but Manning found out and was furious.

During her time in Egypt, Manning became a contributor to two Middle East-based literary magazines, "Desert Poets" and "Personal Landscapes", founded by Bernard Spencer, Lawrence Durrell and Robin Fedden. The last sought to explore the "personal landscapes" of writers experiencing exile during the war. The founders, like Manning, maintained a strong attachment to Greece rather than an artistic and intellectual engagement with Egypt. In remembering the departure from Greece Manning wrote "We faced the sea / Knowing until the day of our return we would be / Exiles from a country not our own." During their time in Egypt and Palestine Manning and her husband maintained close links with refugee Greek writers, including translating and editing the work of George Seferis and Elie Papadimitriou. Manning described her impressions of the Cairo poetry scene in "Poets in Exile" in Cyril Connolly's magazine Horizon. She defended the writers from the claim of a London reviewer that they were "out of touch", suggesting that their work was strengthened by their access to other cultures, languages and writers. Her review was much critiqued by those featured, including Durrell, who objected to Spencer's poetry being praised at his expense.

In 1942 Smith was appointed as Controller of English and Arabic Programming at the Palestine Broadcasting Service in Jerusalem; the job was to begin later but in early July, with the German troops rapidly advancing on Egypt, he persuaded Manning to go ahead to Jerusalem to "prepare the way".

== Palestine ==
The couple were to spend three years in Jerusalem. On arrival, Manning approached the Jerusalem Post for a job, and was soon appointed a reviewer. Between 1943 and 1944 she served as press assistant at Jerusalem's Public Information office, and then moved to the same position at the British Council office in Jerusalem. Manning continued to work on her book about Stanley and Emin Pasha, and took advantage of army drivers who were willing to give lifts to civilians; she visited Palestine, Petra and Damascus, gathering material for future works.

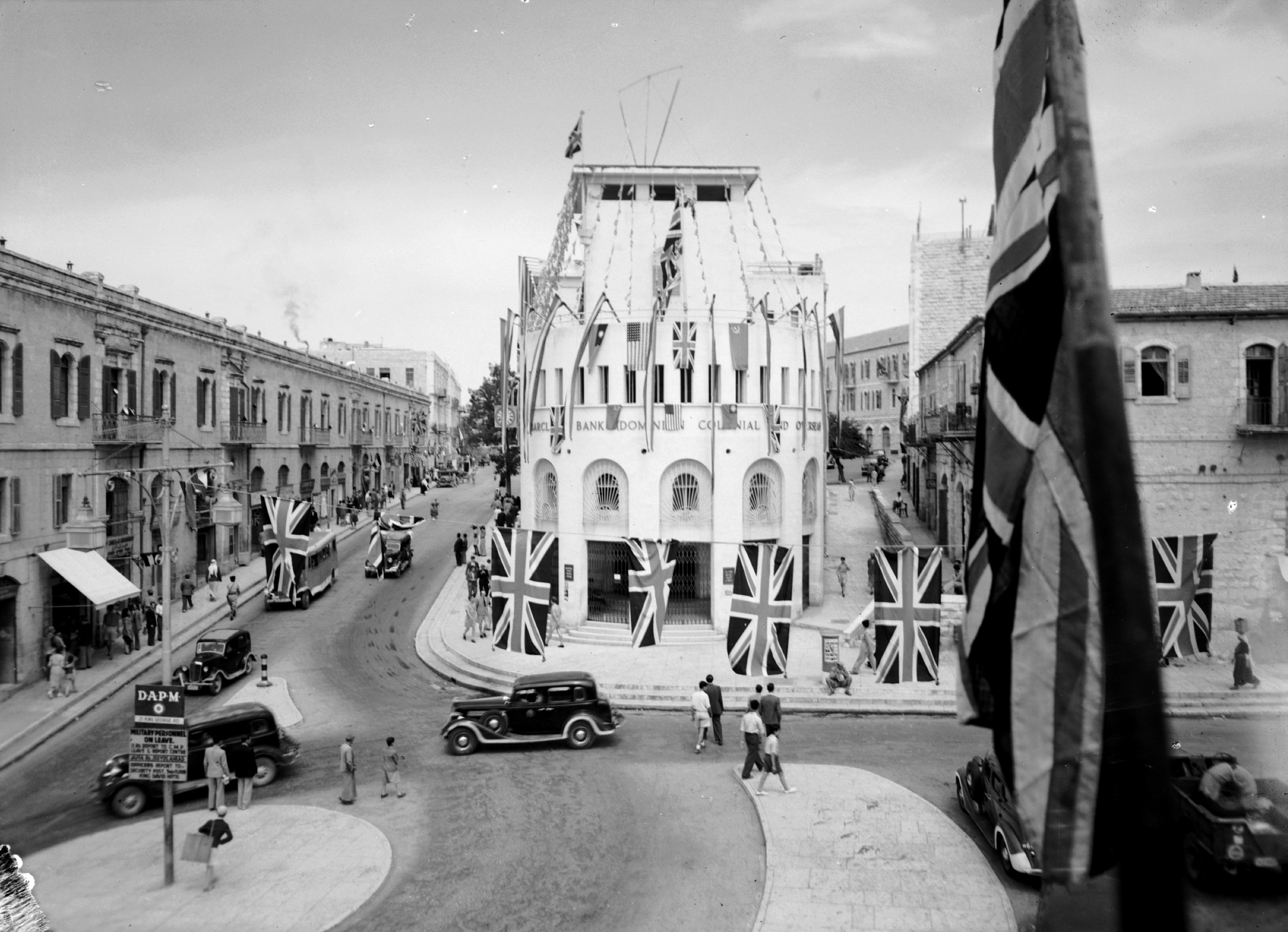
Jerusalem, VE Day, 1945

In 1944, Manning became pregnant; the couple were overjoyed and Manning relaxed, becoming less critical of others, including her own mother, with whom she had long had a difficult relationship. Uncharacteristically, she rested, walked, painted and even knitted. In the seventh month the baby died in utero, and as was the practice at the time Manning was obliged to wait two difficult months to deliver her dead child. "I am like a walking cemetery", she sorrowfully repeated during this period. Grief-stricken, Manning became paranoid, constantly afraid that Smith would be assassinated. Smith decided that she was having a nervous breakdown and in October 1944 accompanied her to Cyprus for a month's holiday. Returning to Jerusalem, she was still far from well, and the poet Louis Lawler noticed the discontent of this "strange and difficult woman" and Smith's "wonderfully patient" behaviour, despite Manning calling her husband by his last name throughout the period. Manning never fully recovered from her loss and was rarely to talk or write of it. She was unable to have further children and in the future directed her maternal feelings towards animals, especially cats.

During her time in the Middle East Manning had picked up amoebic dysentery, which led to several admissions to hospitals in Cairo and Palestine. When the war in Europe ended in May 1945, her state of health led the couple to decide that Manning should return to Britain earlier than Smith. They travelled to Suez together, whence she sailed for home alone.

== Post-war England ==
After a brief stay with her still-grieving parents in heavily bombed Portsmouth, Manning moved into a London flat. Smith arrived in mid-1945 and found a job in the Features Department of the British Broadcasting Corporation (BBC). He was identified as a Communist spy by MI5 in 1947 and placed under surveillance. According to his file, Smith had been working to increase Soviet influence in Romania and the Middle East throughout the war. Manning did not share her husband's political beliefs, but was quite aware that their phone was being tapped and feared that his open support for Communism would lead to him being sacked from the BBC. Smith was soon transferred away from Features to the less politically sensitive Drama department. The surveillance stopped when he resigned from the Communist Party after the Russian invasion of Hungary in 1956.

Manning also worked for the BBC; she wrote scripts for radio including adaptations of novels by George Eliot, Arnold Bennett and Ada Leverson. She completed her book on Stanley and Emin Pasha, titled The Remarkable Expedition in the UK and The Reluctant Rescue in the US, which was published in 1947, and subsequently reissued in 1985. The book received generally good reviews but remains comparatively unknown. In 1948, her book of short stories, Growing Up, was published by Heinemann, with the title story a fictionalised account of her affair with Hamish Miles. Manning was to remain with the publisher until 1974.

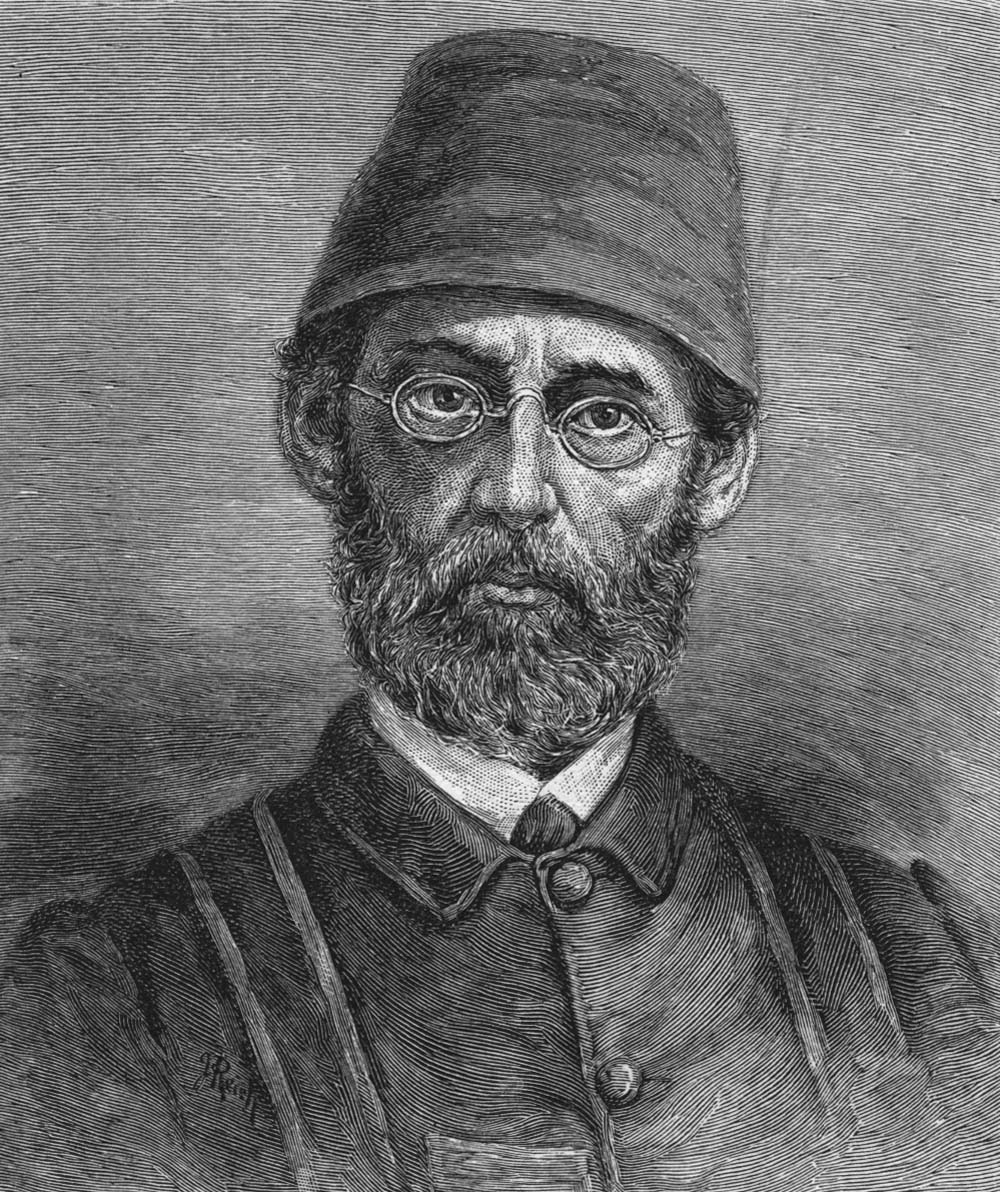
Emin Pasha; subject of the book The Remarkable Expedition

After living in a series of rented flats, in 1951 the couple moved to a house in St. John's Wood, where they sublet rooms to lodgers such as the actors Julian Mitchell and Tony Richardson. Fuelled by plenty of gin and tonic to cover her shyness, Manning could be a witty participant in London's literary scene; as in childhood she was given to making boastful inventions, such as claiming a family relationship to Marie Belloc Lowndes and that she had received a marriage proposal from Anthony Burgess the morning after his wife's death. Her insecurities also showed in other ways: she was very anxious about finances, and always alert for ways to make and save money. After the war both she and Smith were unfaithful. At parties, Smith would regularly ask other women if they were interested in extramarital encounters, while Manning claimed to have had affairs with both William Gerhardie and Henry Green, and engaged in an unrequited pursuit of her lodger, Tony Richardson. Jerry Slattery, her doctor, became her long-term lover; her affair came as a shock to Smith, who felt he must have disappointed his wife. After a difficult start, Smith adjusted and soon became a close friend of Slattery. Manning's adultery in some ways made it easier for Smith to justify his own frequent affairs, including his longstanding relationship with Diana Robson, who was to become his second wife. Manning never paid undue attention to his infidelities, usually responding, "you know what Reggie's like". The two never contemplated divorce, believing that marriage was a lifelong commitment.

Manning's first post-war novel, Artist Among the Missing, an evocative account of life in the Middle East, was published in 1949 and received mixed reviews. She worked on an Irish travel book, The Dreaming Shore, which drew on her Anglo-Irish upbringing, but proved "a millstone" as it required multiple expensive journeys to Ireland. The book was notable for her view that Ireland would one day be united. Manning continued the series of publications with School for Love, published in 1951. The novel concerned a boy growing up in Palestine during the Second World War. With its publication, Smith, on whom Manning relied heavily for literary judgment, help, and support, boasted that "My Olivia is what might be called an established author". The novel was generally well-received, but faced the possibility of a libel suit from Clarissa Graves, sister of Robert on whom Miss Bohun, one of the novel's characters, may have been based.

Manning supplemented her book writing by reviewing for The Spectator, The Sunday Times, The Observer, Punch and others, as well as making occasional contributions to the Palestine Post. Her fourth novel, A Different Face, was published in 1953. Set in a drab city based on Manning's hometown of Portsmouth, it chronicled the main character's attempts to leave his birthplace. The book was not well-reviewed, and as was frequently the case, Manning felt slighted, feeling that she did not get the reviews she deserved. Neurotic self-doubt and perfectionism made her difficult and easily offended, and she was very aware of younger writers outstripping her. Such an author was Iris Murdoch, with whom Manning shared an interest in flying saucers and an uneasy friendship that was tinged with jealousy at the younger Murdoch's greater success. Manning knew that she was spiteful, but could not help herself, frequently critiquing writer friends to others. She consistently praised and admired Ivy Compton-Burnett to whom she had been introduced in 1945, and whose friendship she greatly valued. She complained about her publisher Heinemann and her lack of recognition from her peers: Anthony Powell called her "the world's worst grumbler", and the publisher remembered that she was "never an easy author to handle". A friend gave her the nickname "Olivia Moaning", which was picked up by others, much to Manning's annoyance.

In 1955 Manning published The Doves of Venus, which drew on her experiences in London in the 1930s; the two friends, Ellie Parsons and Nancy Claypole, bore similarities to Manning and Stevie Smith. In the book, an isolated Ellie seeks to escape a stultifying mother. The reviews were generally favourable, but Manning was not satisfied. Perhaps annoyed at her depiction in the novel, Stevie Smith wrote what Manning described as a "bitchy review"; the two great friends barely spoke thereafter, despite Smith's efforts at a rapprochement. Eventually, Manning grudgingly forgave her: learning of Smith's final illness, she remarked, "Well, if she's really ill, we'll have to let bygones be bygones."

Much time and focus were given to animals, especially the Siamese cats of which Manning was especially fond. She was very concerned about the health and comfort of her pets, taking them on visits to friends, along with hot water bottles for them in case the temperature dropped. She frequently sacked vets – telling one "I do not pay you to tell me that there is nothing wrong with my animal" – and trying animal faith healers at times. She was also a committed supporter of organisations combating animal cruelty. Her love and interest in cats was illustrated in her book Extraordinary Cats, published in 1967.

In December 1956, Manning published My Husband Cartwright, a series of twelve sketches about Smith that had originally appeared in Punch. It was not widely reviewed, and as usual, Manning was frustrated and annoyed. The book was to be a precursor of her portrait of her husband in Fortunes of War, detailing comic episodes that highlighted Smith's character, including his gregarious nature and interest in social issues: "My husband Cartwright is a lover of his fellow-men. Lovers of their fellow-men can be maddening ... While lecturing abroad he suddenly conceived a resentment of 'sights' especially 'useless' sights, such as ruins or tombs. You might suppose that were it not for such distractions as Tiberias, the Valley of the Kings or Hadrian's Villa, tourists abroad would occupy themselves solely in alleviating poverty."

== The Balkan Trilogy and other works ==
Between 1956 and 1964 Manning's main project was The Balkan Trilogy, a sequence of three novels based on her experiences during the Second World War; as usual she was supported and encouraged by Smith. The books describe the marriage of Harriet and Guy Pringle as they live and work in Romania and Greece, ending with their escape to Alexandria in 1941 just ahead of the Germans. Guy, a man at once admirable and unsatisfactory, and Harriet, a woman alternately proud and impatient, move from early passion to acceptance of difference. Manning described the books as long chapters of an autobiography, and early versions were written in the first person, though there was significant fictionalisation. While Manning had been 31 and Smith 25 at the outset of war, Manning's alter ego Harriet Pringle was a mere 21, and her husband a year older. Manning was a writer by profession, while her creation was not. The first book in the trilogy, The Great Fortune, received mixed reviews, but subsequent volumes, The Spoilt City and Friends and Heroes were generally well-received; Anthony Burgess announced that Manning was "among the most accomplished of our women novelists" and comparisons were made to Lawrence Durrell, Graham Greene, Evelyn Waugh and Anthony Powell. There were a few unfavorable criticisms, and as usual, they ignited Manning's ire.

Following the publication of the final volume of The Balkan Trilogy in 1965, Manning worked on her cat memoir and a collection of short stories, A Romantic Hero and Other Stories, both of which were published in 1967. Another novel, The Play Room (published as The Camperlea Girls in the US), appeared in 1969. The book of short stories and The Play Room both contained homosexual themes, a topic which interested Manning. The latter was a less than successful exploration of the lives and interests of adolescents, though the reviews were generally encouraging. A film version was proposed, and Ken Annakin asked her to write the script. The movie, with more explicit lesbian scenes than the book, was all but made before the money ran out; a second version, with a very different script, was also developed but came to nothing. "Everything fizzled out", she said. "I wasted a lot of time and that is something which you cannot afford to do when you are sixty"; in keeping with her obfuscations about her age, she was actually sixty-two.

== The Levant Trilogy ==
The 1970s brought a number of changes to the household: the couple moved to a smaller apartment following Smith's early retirement from the BBC and 1972 appointment as a lecturer at the New University of Ulster in Coleraine. The couple subsequently lived apart for long periods, as Manning rejected the idea of moving to Ireland. In 1974 Manning adapted two of Arnold Bennett's works (The Card and The Regent) into an eight part BBC Radio play: Denry - The Adventures Of A Card. Graham Armitage portrayed the eponymous Denry with Ursula O'Leary as the beautiful Countess of Chell.

Manning was always a close observer of life, and gifted with a photographic memory. She told her friend Kay Dick that, "I write out of experience, I have no fantasy. I don't think anything I've experienced has ever been wasted. Her 1974 novel The Rain Forest showed off her creative skills in her portrayal of a fictional island in the Indian Ocean and its inhabitants. Set in 1953, the novel's central characters are a British couple; the book examines their personal experiences and tragedies against the background of a violent end to colonial British rule. The book is one of Manning's lesser-known books, and she was disappointed that it was not shortlisted for the Booker Prize.

Early in 1975 Manning began The Danger Tree, which for a time she described as "The Fourth Part of the Balkan Trilogy"; in the event, it became the first novel in The Levant Trilogy, continuing the story of the Pringles in the Middle East. The first book proved "a long struggle" to write, in part because of Manning's lack of confidence in her powers of invention: the book juxtaposes the Desert War experiences of a young officer, Simon Boulderstone, with the securer lives of the Pringles and their circle. Manning, fascinated by sibling relationships, and remembering the death of her own brother, also examined the relationship between Simon and his elder brother, Hugo. She felt inadequate in her ability to write about soldiers and military scenes; initial reviewers agreed, finding her writing unconvincing and improbable, though subsequent reviewers have been considerably kinder.

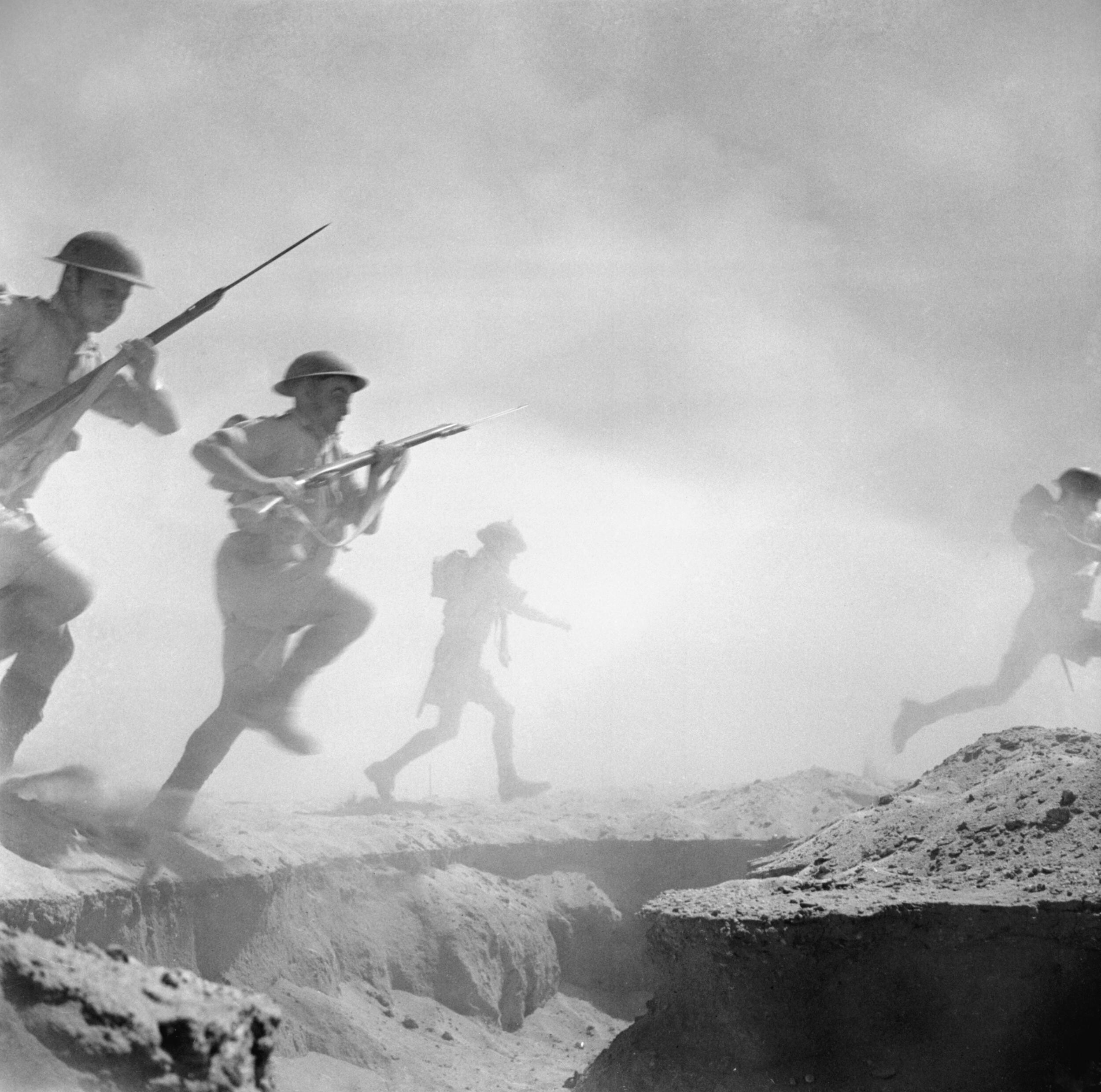
British soldiers at El Alamein during the Desert War

While some parts of the book were inventions, she also made use of real-life incidents. The opening chapter of The Danger Tree describes the accidental death of the young son of Sir Desmond and Lady Hooper. The incident was based on fact: Sir Walter and Lady Amy Smart's eight-year-old boy was killed when he picked up a stick bomb during a desert picnic in January 1943. Just as described in the novel, his grief-stricken parents had tried to feed the dead boy through a hole in his cheek. Manning had long been resentful at the Smarts' failure to include her and Smith in their artistic circle in Cairo. The scene was considered in poor taste even by Manning's friends, who were also outraged that the quiet and faithful Lady Smart was associated with Manning's very different Lady Hooper. Though both Sir Walter and his wife had died by the time of publication, Manning's publisher received a solicitor's letter written on behalf of the Smart family, objecting to the scene and requiring that there should be no further reference to the incident or to the couple in future volumes. Manning ignored both requests. She based the character of Aidan Pratt on the actor, writer, and poet Stephen Haggard, whom she had known in Jerusalem. Like Pratt, Haggard committed suicide on a train from Cairo to Palestine, but in Haggard's case it followed the end of a relationship with a beautiful Egyptian woman, rather than unrequited homosexual love. After years of complaints about her publisher Heinemann, Manning moved to Weidenfeld & Nicolson, and remained with them until the end of her life. The Danger Tree was a considerable critical success, and though Manning was disappointed yet again that her novel was not shortlisted for the Booker prize, The Yorkshire Post selected it as their Best Novel of 1977. This award followed her appointment as a Commander of the Order of the British Empire in the 1976 Birthday Honours.

With Field Marshal Montgomery's Memoirs as her guide, Manning found battle scenes easier to write in the second volume of the trilogy, The Battle Lost and Won. After a slow start, Manning wrote with certainty and speed; the book was completed in a record seven months and published in 1978. The book follows the Pringles as Rommel and the Afrika Korps approach Alexandria, where Guy is teaching. Egypt remains a place of privilege and sexual exchange for the non-combatants and the Pringles' marriage slowly disintegrates.

== Final years ==
Manning was deeply affected by the sudden death in 1977 of Jerry Slattery, her lover and confidant for more than a quarter of a century. Manning's last years were also made difficult by physical deterioration; arthritis increasingly affected her, leading to hip replacements in 1976 and in 1979 and she suffered poor health related to amoebic dysentery caught in the Middle East. Manning began work on the final novel in The Levant Trilogy, The Sum of Things, in which Harriet agrees to sail home to the UK, but having said goodbye to Guy, changes her mind. The novel describes Harriet's travels in Syria, Lebanon and Palestine, observes Guy's supposed widowerhood in Cairo after he hears of the sinking of Harriet's ship, and follows Simon Boulderstone's injury during the battle of El Alamein and recovery.

The Sum of Things was published posthumously, for on 4 July 1980 Manning suffered a severe stroke while visiting friends in the Isle of Wight. She died in hospital in Ryde on 23 July; somewhat typically, Smith, having been recalled from Ireland, was not present when she died. He could not bear to see her "fade away" and had gone to London to keep himself busy. Manning had long predicted that the frequently tardy Smith would be late for her funeral, and he almost was. His mourning period, characterised by abrupt transitions from weeping to almost hysterical mirth, was precisely how Manning had imagined Guy Pringle's reaction to Harriet's supposed death in The Sum of Things. Manning was cremated and her ashes buried at Billingham Manor on the Isle of Wight.

Manning had long complained about the lack of recognition she had received as a writer and was not consoled when her husband and friends responded that her talent would be recognised, and her works read for years to come. "I want to be really famous now, Now", she retorted. As it happened, her renown and readership developed substantially after her death; a television serialisation of Fortunes of War starring Emma Thompson and Kenneth Branagh finally came to fruition in 1987, bringing her work to a wider audience.

== Work ==
=== Reception ===
The posthumous popularity of Fortunes of War notwithstanding, most of Manning's books are rarely read and have received little critical attention. Of her books, only Fortunes of War, School for Love, The Doves of Venus, The Rain Forest and A Romantic Hero remain in print. Some of her novels, most often Fortunes of War, have been translated into French, German, Finnish, Swedish, Danish, Spanish, Greek, Romanian and Hebrew. As in her lifetime, opinions are divided; some assert that her books are "flawed by self-indulgence and a lack of self-judgment", and criticise portrayals of ethnic and religious groups as stereotyped and caricatured. Others praise tight, perceptive and convincing narratives and excellent characterisation. Her plots are often described as journeys, odysseys and quests in both literal and metaphorical senses. Manning's talent for "exquisite evocations of place", including physical, cultural and historical aspects have been widely admired, and the critic Walter Allen complimented her "painter's eye for the visible world".

==== Fortunes of War ====
Manning's best known works, the six books comprising Fortunes of War, have been described as "the most underrated novels of the twentieth century" and the author as "among the greatest practitioners of 20th-century roman-fleuve". Written during the Cold War more than sixteen years after the period described, The Balkan Trilogy, set in Romania and Greece, is considered one of the most important literary treatments of the region in wartime, while criticised for the Cold War era images of Balkanism, and for Manning's inability to "conceal her antipathy towards all things Romanian". The Levant Trilogy, set in the Middle East, is praised for its detailed description of Simon Boulderstone's desert war experience and the juxtaposition of the Pringles and their marriage with important world events. Excerpts from the novels have been reprinted in collections of women's war writing. Theodore Steinberg argues for the Fortunes of War to be seen as an epic novel, noting its broad scope and the large cast of interesting characters set at a pivotal point of history. As with other epic novels, the books examine intertwined personal and national themes. There are frequent references to the Fall of Troy, including Guy Pringle's production of Shakespeare's Troilus and Cressida in which British expatriates play themselves while Romania and Europe mirror the doomed Troy. In Steinberg's perspective, the books also challenge the typically male genre conventions of the epic novel by viewing the war principally through the eyes of a female character "who frequently contrasts her perceptions with those of the men who surround her". In contrast, Adam Piette views the novel sequence as a failed epic, the product of a Cold War desire to repress change as illustrated by "Harriet's self-pityingly dogged focus on their marriage" without dealing with the radicalism of the war, and fate of its victims as represented by Guy and his political engagement.

==== Other works ====
Manning's other works have largely been described as precursors to the two trilogies. Her pre-war novel, The Wind Changes (1937), set in Ireland, anticipates the future works in its "subtle exploration of relationships against a backdrop of war". Her post-war works, which are alternately set at home and abroad, are considered first, less than successful steps in clarifying her ideas about an expatriate war and how to write about it. Novels and stories set in England and Ireland are permeated by staleness and discontent, while those set abroad highlight the excitement and adventure of her later works. Two books set in Jerusalem, The Artist Among the Missing (1949) and School for Love (1951), her first commercial and critical success, are also first steps in exploring themes such war, colonialism and British imperialism.

Manning wrote reviews, radio adaptations and scripts and several non-fiction books. Her book The Remarkable Expedition (1947) about Emin Pasha and Henry Stanley was generally well reviewed, and when reissued in 1985 was praised for its humour, story telling and fairness to both subjects. Her travel book about Ireland, The Dreaming Shore (1950), received a mixed review even from her old friend Louis MacNeice, but extracts from this and other of Manning's Irish writing have subsequently been admired and anthologised. Manning's book Extraordinary cats (1967) proved to be chiefly about her own well-loved pets, and Stevie Smith's review in the Sunday Times complained that the book was "more agitated than original". She also published two collections of short stories, the well-reviewed Growing Up (1946) and A Romantic Hero and Other Stories (1967); the latter included eight stories from the earlier volume, and is imbued with a sense of mortality.

=== Themes ===
==== War ====
In contrast to other women's war fiction of the period, Manning's works do not recount life on the home front. Instead, her Irish and Second World War fiction observe combatants and non-combatants at the front and behind the lines. Wars, in Manning's view, are battles for place and influence, and "with her range of images and illusions, Manning reminds us that wars over land have been a constant". Her books do not celebrate British heroism nor the innocence of civilians, emphasising instead that the causes and dangers of war come as much from within as from without, with the gravest threats coming from fellow Britons. Military men are far from heroic, and official British responses are presented as farcical. In the Fortunes of War, the conflict is viewed largely from the perspective of a civilian woman, an observer, though later books include Simon Boulderstone's soldier's view of battle. Views differ on her success in the Fortunes of War battlescenes; initial reviews by Auberon Waugh and Hugh Massie criticised them as implausible and not fully realised, but later commentators have describing her depiction of battle as vivid, poignant and largely convincing. Her books serve as an indictment of war and its horrors; William Gerhardie noted in 1954 of Artist among the Missing that "it is war seen in a compass so narrowed down that the lens scorches and all but ignites the paper". There is a strong focus of the impermanence of life; death and mortality are a constant presence and preoccupation for civilian and soldier alike, and repetition – of stories, events and deaths – used to give "the impression of lives trapped in an endless war" for which there is no end in sight.

==== Colonialism and imperialism ====
A major theme of Manning's works is the British empire in decline. Her fiction contrasts deterministic, imperialistic views of history with one that accepts the possibility of change for those displaced by colonialism. Manning's works take a strong stance against British imperialism, and are harshly critical of racism, anti-Semitism and oppression at the end of the British colonial era. "British imperialism is shown to be a corrupt and self-serving system, which not only deserves to be dismantled but which is actually on the verge of being dismantled", writes Steinberg. The British characters in Manning's novels almost all assume the legitimacy of British superiority and imperialism and struggle with their position as oppressors who are unwelcome in countries they have been brought up to believe welcome their colonising influence. In this view, Harriet's character, marginalised as an exile and a woman, is both oppressor and oppressed, while characters such as Guy, Prince Yakimov and Sophie seek to exert various forms of power and authority over others, reflecting in microcosm the national conflicts and imperialism of the British Empire. Phyllis Lassner, who has written extensively on Manning's writing from a colonial and post-colonial perspective, notes how even sympathetic characters are not excused their complicity as colonisers; the responses of the Pringles assert "the vexed relationship between their own status as colonial exiles and that of the colonised" and native Egyptians, though given very little direct voice in The Levant Trilogy, nevertheless assert subjectivity for their country.

In The Artist Among the Missing (1949), Manning illustrates the racial tensions that are created when imperialism and multiculturalism mix, and, as in her other war novels, evaluates the political bind in which the British seek to defeat racist Nazism while upholding British colonial exploitation. The School for Love (1951) is the tale of an orphaned boy's journey of disillusionment in a city that is home to Arabs, Jews and a repressive, colonial presence represented in the novel by the cold, self-righteous, and anti-Semitic character of Miss Bohun.

Manning explores these themes not only in her major novels set in Europe and the Middle East, but also in her Irish fiction, The Wind Changes (1937) and eight short stories which were mostly written early in her career. In these works, colonialist attitudes are reproduced by Manning's stereotyping of Catholic southerners as wild, primitive and undisciplined, while northerners live lives of well-ordered efficiency. Displaced principal characters struggle to find their place in social groups whose values they no longer accept. Manning has also been noted for her direct and early focus on the impact of the end of colonial rule. The Rain Forest (1974) presents a later, highly pessimistic view, satirising British expatriate values on a fictional island. It also critiques those involved in the independence movement, expressing a disillusioned view of the island's future post-independence prospects.

==== Displacement and "Otherness" ====
Displacement and alienation are regular themes in Manning's books. Characters are often isolated, physically and emotionally removed from family and familiar contexts and seeking a place to belong. This crisis of identity may reflect that of Manning herself as the daughter of an Irish mother and a British naval officer. "I'm really confused about what I am, never really feeling that I belong in either place", she told an interviewer in 1969. In Manning's war fiction, conflict creates additional anxiety, emotional displacement and distance, with characters unable to communicate with each other. Eve Patten notes the "pervasive sense of liminality" and the recurrent figure of the refugee in Manning's work. Early literary interest in displacement was reinforced by Manning's own terrifying and disorientating experiences as a refugee during the war. Her travels also brought her into direct contact with the far worse plight of other war refugees, including Jewish asylum-seekers who were leaving Romania aboard the Struma. Exile had its rewards for literary refugees such as Manning, offering exposure to different cultures and "the sense of a greater, past civilisation", as she described in her 1944 review of British poetry. Her writing reflects her deep concern for the realities of most refugees, who are portrayed as "a degraded and demoralised Other", challenging complacent Western notions of stability and nationality.

Manning has been classified as an Orientalist writer, whose depictions of cultures frequently emphasise exoticism and alien landscape. This feature has been most closely examined in her novels set in Romania. In these, scholars note Manning's positioning of Romania as an exotic "Other", a legacy of the Ottoman Empire located at the limits of civilised Europe and on the frontier with the uncivilised Orient. Her negative perceptions of Romanian "Otherness" include a childlike population living decadent lives, passive and immoral women, corruption, and a wild, untamed environment. These are contrasted with more positive reactions to Greece and Western Europe as the centre of civilising and orderly life in other books. In keeping with colonial construction of exoticism in Western literature, "otherness" is increasingly domesticated as characters recognise, with greater exposure to the country, links to Western culture. Her depiction of Romania led to Fortunes of War being restricted as seditious writing under Romania's Communist government.

==== Gender and feminism ====
Manning's books are not easily classified as a part of the feminist canon. Manning supported the rights of women, particularly equal literary fees, but had no sympathy for the women's movement, writing that "[t]hey make such an exhibition of themselves. None can be said to be beauties. Most have faces like porridge." In Manning's books, the word "feminine" is used in a derogatory sense, and tends to be associated with female complacency, foolishness, artifice and deviousness, and fulfilment for women comes in fairly conventional roles of wife, mother and the private domain. Elizabeth Bowen remarked that Manning had "an almost masculine outfit in the way of experience" that influenced her writing about women and the war. Manning viewed herself not as a female writer, but as a writer who happened to be a woman, and early in her career she obscured her gender using a pseudonym and initials. Manning found it easier to create male characters, and in general her novels tend to minimise differences in gender, writing about people rather than women in particular. Harriet Pringle, for example, moves through processes of self-discovery and empowerment as an individual rather than in feminist solidarity with her sex. In Manning's The Doves of Venus (1960), based on Manning's friendship with Stevie Smith, female characters display "the 1950s anger more often associated ... with young men". Treglown comments on how Manning's early books generally took a forthright approach to sex, often initiated by female characters. Her approach became more nuanced in later volumes, with a subtler depiction of sex, sensuality and sexual frustration in Fortunes of War. The Jungian critic Richard Sugg interpreted Manning's female characters as punishing themselves for breaching society's gender norms, including for having erotic feelings. In contrast, Treglown hypothesised that it reflected Manning's ongoing grieving for her stillborn child.

== Works ==
- Rose of Rubies (1929) – as Jacob Morrow
- Here is Murder (1929) – as Jacob Morrow
- The Black Scarab (1929) – as Jacob Morrow
- The Wind Changes (UK: 1937, 1988; US: 1938)
- Remarkable Expedition: The Story of Stanley's Rescue of Emin Pasha from Equatorial Africa (The Reluctant Rescue in the US) (UK: 1947, 1991; US: 1947, 1985)
- Growing Up (UK: 1948)
- Artist Among the Missing (UK: 1949, 1950, 1975)
- The Dreaming Shore (UK: 1950)
- School for Love (UK: 1951, 1959, 1974, 1982, 1983, 1991, 2001, 2004; US: 2009)
- A Different Face (UK: 1953, 1975; US: 1957)
- The Doves of Venus (UK: 1955, 1959, 1974, 1984, 1992, 2001; US: 1956)
- My Husband Cartwright (UK: 1956)
- The Great Fortune (The Balkan Trilogy; UK: 1960, 1961, 1967, 1968, 1969, 1973, 1974, 1980, 1988, 1992, 1994, 1995 2000; US: 1961)
- The Spoilt City (The Balkan Trilogy; UK: 1962, 1963, 1967, 1968, 1974, 1980, 1988, 1994, 2000; US: 1962)
- Friends and Heroes (The Balkan Trilogy; UK: 1965, 1974, 1987, 1988, 1994; US: 1966)
- Collected as Fortunes of War: the Balkan Trilogy (UK: 1981, 1986, 1987, 1988, 1989, 1990, 2004; US: 1988, 2005, 2010)
- Extraordinary Cats (UK: 1967)
- A Romantic Hero, and other stories (UK: 1967, 1992, 2001)
- The Play Room (The Camperlea Girls in the US) (UK: 1969, 1971, 1976, 1984; US: 1969)
- The Rain Forest (UK: 1974, 1977, 1983, 1984, 1986, 1991, 2001, 2004)
- The Danger Tree (The Levant Trilogy; UK: 1977, 1979, US: 1977)
- The Battle Lost and Won (The Levant Trilogy; UK: 1978, 1980; US: 1979)
- The Sum of Things (The Levant Trilogy; UK: 1980, 1982; US: 1981)
- Collected as Fortunes of War: the Levant Trilogy (UK: 1982, 1983, 1985, 1987, 1988, 1989, 1996, 2001, 2003; US: 1982, 1988, 1996)
