= Wetware (film) =

- Directed by: Jay Craven
- Screenplay by: Jay Craven
- Based on: Wetware by Craig Nova
- Starring: Jerry O'Connell
- Cinematography: Brad Heck
- Music by: Judy Hyman; Jeff Claus
- Release date: September 29, 2018 (Middlebury, Vermont)
- Country: United States
- Language: English

Wetware is a 2018 American science fiction film written and directed by Jay Craven and starring Jerry O'Connell. It is based on Craig Nova's novel of the same name.

== Cast ==
- Jerry O'Connell as Wendell Blaine
- Morgan Wolk as Kay
- Cameron Scoggins as Hal Briggs
- Bret Lada as Jack Portman
- Jessica Blank as Virginia
- Labhaoise Magee as Gloria
- Dallas Mahan as Austin Kitteridge
- Susan S. McGinnis as Evelyn Black
- Nicole Shalhoub as Carr
- Aurélia Thiérrée as "Clock"
- Matt Salinger as Mashita
- Lauren Carole Ritter as Jennifer
- Brandon Alan Smith as Hart
- Ariel Zevon as Officer Zelda
- Kimberly Arthurs as Mungo
- Hunter Hard as Mongo
- Kristan Lyon as Mongo
- Christopher Mikael as Mongo Supervisor Fighter
- Tara O'Reilly as Hipster
- Bianca Ilich as Hostess

== Production ==
The film was shot in Brattleboro, Vermont and Nantucket.

== Release ==
The film premiered at the Town Hall Theater in Middlebury, Vermont on September 29, 2018. It was also released at Catamount Arts in St. Johnsbury, Vermont on October 5, 2018.
