= Matt Salinger =

American actor (born 1960)

- Born: Matthew Douglas Salinger; February 13, 1960 (age 66); Windsor, Vermont, U.S.
- Education: Columbia University (BA)
- Occupation: Actor
- Years active: 1984–present
- Spouse: Betsy Becker (m. 1985)
- Children: 2
- Father: J. D. Salinger

Matthew Douglas Salinger (/ˈsælɪndʒər/ SAL-in-jər; born February 13, 1960) is an American actor and producer known for his appearances in the films Revenge of the Nerds and Captain America.

== Early life ==
Salinger was born February 13, 1960, in Windsor, Vermont, to author J. D. Salinger, known for The Catcher in the Rye, and psychologist Alison Claire Douglas. His maternal grandfather was British art critic Robert Langton Douglas. He has one sister, Margaret Salinger. His father was of paternal Lithuanian-Jewish descent, and of maternal German, Irish, and Scottish descent.

Salinger attended North Country School in Lake Placid, New York, for junior high school. He graduated from Phillips Academy Andover and attended Princeton University before graduating from Columbia University with a degree in art history and drama.

== Career ==
Salinger made his film debut in 1984 in Revenge of the Nerds and played Captain America in the 1990 film Captain America.

He subsequently appeared in films including What Dreams May Come and on television in episodes of Law & Order: Special Victims Unit, and 24.

Salinger has produced several independent films, including Let the Devil Wear Black, and Mojave Moon.

Salinger made his Broadway debut in 1985 in Bill C. Davis's short-lived Dancing in the End Zone, performing at the Ritz Theater alongside veteran actresses Pat Carroll and Dorothy Lyman. In 2000, he produced the off-Broadway play The Syringa Tree, which received a Drama Desk Award, Drama League Award, Outer Critic's Circle Award, and the Village Voice Obie Award for Best Play of the Year in 2001.

== Personal life ==
Salinger married jewelry designer Betsy Jane Becker in 1985. They live in Fairfield County, Connecticut, and have two sons, Gannon and Avery.

Unlike his sister, Margaret, who wrote a 1999 memoir about her childhood titled Dream Catcher, Salinger has sought to protect his father's privacy. A few weeks after Margaret's book was published, Salinger wrote a letter to The New York Observer, criticizing his sister's "gothic tales of our supposed childhood."

== Filmography ==
=== Film ===
Year	Title	Role
1984	Revenge of the Nerds	Danny Burke
1986	Power	Phillip Aarons
1989	Options	Donald Anderson
1990	Captain America	Steve Rogers / Captain America
1994	Fortunes of War	Peter Kernan
1994	Babyfever	James
1996	Mojave Moon	
1998	What Dreams May Come	Reverend Hanley
1999	Let the Devil Wear Black	Cop #1
2002	The Year That Trembled	Professor Jeff Griggs
2005	Bigger Than the Sky	Mal Gunn
2010	Harvest	Professor Wickstrom
2014	Learning to Drive	Peter
2015	Endless Night (Spanish: Nadie quiere la noche)	Captain Spalding
2017	Love After Love	Michael
2018	Wetware	Mashita
2019	A Call to Spy	William Donovan
2021	The Ice Road	CEO Thomason

=== Television ===
Year	Title	Role	Notes
1986	Blood & Orchids	Bryce Parker	(Made for TV) crime-drama film
1986	Manhunt for Claude Dallas	Claude Dallas Jr.	(Made for TV)
1987	Deadly Deception	Jack Shoat	(Made for TV)
1993	Picket Fences	Dr. Danny Shreve	family drama television series
1993–1994	Second Chances	Mike Chulack	drama television series
2004	Law & Order: Special Victims Unit	Seth Webster	Season 5 / Episode 13 – "Hate"
2004–2005	24	Mark Kanar	Day 3 (Season 3 / 2004): 9:00 a.m.-10:00 a.m. Day 4 (Season 4 / 2005): 9:00 a.m.-10:00 a.m.
2008	Law & Order: Criminal Intent	Bill Phillips	Season 7 / Episode 19 – "Legacy"

=== Video ===
Year	Title	Role	Notes
1993	Firehawk	Tex	action film (Directed by Cirio H. Santiago)
2005	The Marksman	General Parent (as Matthew Salinger)	action film (Directed by Marcus Adams)
2005	Black Dawn	Myshkin (as Matthew Salinger)	action film (Directed by Alexander Gruszynski)
2008	Pistol Whipped	Dealer	action film (Directed by Roel Reiné)

=== Theatre ===
Year	Title	Role	Notes
1985	Dancing in the End Zone	James Bernard	
2000	The Syringa Tree	-----	(Produced by Matthew Salinger)
