= David Caplovitz =

David Caplovitz (died October 1, 1992) was a United States-based sociologist. He is known as the author of The Poor Pay More and for advancing consumer protection.

== Recognition ==
Caplovitz won a Guggenheim Fellowship in Sociology in 1977.
