= The Good Son (Nova novel) =

1982 novel by Craig Nova

- First edition (publ. Delacorte Press)
- Author: Craig Nova
- Language: English
- Publication date: 1982

The Good Son is a 1982 novel by Craig Nova.

== Reception ==
John Irving in The New York Times wrote that it was the highest quality of the author's novels and "the richest and most expert novel in my recent reading by any writer now under 40." In The Boston Phoenix, John Domini called The Good Son a "masterful new novel."
