= Billingham Manor =

Coordinates: 50.6348°N 1.3141°W

- Interactive map of the Billingham Manor area
- Alternative names: Billingham House

General information
- Type: Manor house
- Classification: Grade II*
- Location: Chillerton, United Kingdom
- Opened: 1631

Billingham Manor (or Billingham House) is a manor house lying about a mile south of the village of Chillerton on the Isle of Wight.

The oldest part of the house dates from 1631. The house was largely remodelled a hundred years later by Edward Worsley, son of Sir Edward Worsley of Gatcombe House. The house was owned at one time by J.B. Priestley.

Considered to be one of the island's antiquities, it is a Grade II* listed building since 1951.

It was the seat of the Worsley family, and owned at one time by a Mrs. Lawrence. British novelist, poet, writer and reviewer Olivia Manning was cremated and her ashes buried at the manor. At the time it was rented by Sir Shane Leslie, Billingham was regarded as the most haunted house on the Island.

== Architecture and fittings ==
There is a fine oak staircase dating to the Queen Anne period. Panelled oak room with secret recess. Subterranean passage leading from North to South end of house.
