= The Poor Pay More =

1967 book by David Caplovitz

- Author: David Caplovitz
- Subject: Consumer movement
- Publisher: Free Press
- Publication place: United States
- English publication date: October 1967
- ISBN: 978-0029052501

The Poor Pay More is a 1967 book published by David Caplovitz. It is a sociology study of what could be called the "poverty penalty", which is a concept that poor people pay more for the same goods and services as people with more money do.

Esther Peterson cited the book as being important for understanding contemporary consumer problems.

In 2010 a researcher cited the book as still being relevant.
