= Sylvia Wilkinson =

American author (born 1940)

- Born: Sylvia Jean Wilkinson; 1940 (age 85–86); Durham, North Carolina, United States
- Education: Woman's College (B.A., 1962); Hollins College (M.A., 1963); University of North Carolina at Greensboro; Hollins University
- Occupations: Author, novelist, non-fiction writer, educator
- Writing career
- Years active: 1960s–present
- Period: 1960s–present
- Genres: Fiction, non-fiction, juvenile nonfiction, automotive literature
- Subjects: Auto racing, education, youth literature, fiction
- Notable works: A Killing Frost; Shadow of the Mountain; The Stainless Steel Carrot; Dirt Tracks to Glory; 50/50
- Notable awards: Sir Walter Raleigh Award (1968, 1978); Guggenheim Fellowship (1977); NEA Fellowship; Wallace Stegner Fellowship (1965–66)

Sylvia Jean Wilkinson (born 1940) is an American author.

== Biography ==
She was born in Durham, North Carolina, United States. She graduated from Woman's College, now the University of North Carolina at Greensboro, in 1962. She received her master's degree from Hollins College (now Hollins University) in 1963 and a Wallace Stegner Creative Writing Fellow at Stanford University from 1965 to 1966.

Wilkinson taught at various institutions including the Universities of North Carolina at Asheville and Chapel Hill, the College of William & Mary, Sweet Briar College, Hollins University, Washington University in St. Louis and the University of Wisconsin–Milwaukee. She is a teaching scholar with the National Faculty. She has received a number of literary awards, including the Sir Walter Raleigh Award twice—in 1968 for A Killing Frost, and again in 1978 for Shadow of the Mountain, a Eugene Saxton Grant, a National Endowment for the Arts Fellowship, a Guggenheim Fellowship in 1977, the UNC - Greensboro Alumnae Service Award, and a Mademoiselle Merit Award for Literature. Wilkinson has published 27 books: seven novels for adults, four adult non fiction works (three on auto racing, one on education) and 16 juveniles with automotive themes.

She was a Motorsports Correspondent for Autoweek and is currently a World Book Encyclopedia contributor on auto racing. She was an auto racing timer and scorer for many years for numerous drivers including Paul Newman, Al Unser Sr., Bobby Rahal and Keke Rosberg.

In 2012, her account of the 2.5 Trans-Am seasons featuring the Brock Racing team with driver John Morton during 1971–1972, "The Stainless Steel Carrot", originally published in 1973 by Houghton Mifflin, was reissued by Brown Fox Books with an update on the participants with all royalties going to animal rescue and wildlife groups. In December 2014, her seventh novel, Big Cactus, was published by Owl Canyon Press in Boulder, Colorado. In November 2018, a non-fiction work on race driver John Paul Jr. and his battle with Huntington's Disease entitled "50/50" was published by High Desert Press, with all profits going to Paul Jr.'s research fund at UCLA. n updated version of Dirt Tracks to Glory was published by Racemaker Press, Boston, in April 2022.

== Bibliography ==
Novels:

- Moss on the North Side (Houghton Mifflin, 1966, Rupert Hart Davis, London, 1967), Wie Der Regen Im Wald, (Limes Verlag, Wiesbaden, 1969)
- A Killing Frost (Houghton Mifflin, 1967), Wie Spates Licht Auf Vogelfedern, (Limes Verlag, Wiesbaden, 1967)
- Cale (Houghton Mifflin, 1970)
- Shadow of the Mountain (Houghton Mifflin, 1977)
- Bone of My Bones (Putnam, 1982)
- On the 7th Day, God Created the Chevrolet (Algonquin Books, 1993)
- Big Cactus (Owl Canyon Press, 2014)

Nonfiction:

- Change: A Handbook for the Teaching of English and Social Studies in the Secondary Schools (LINC Press, 1971)
- The Stainless Steel Carrot: An Auto Racing Odyssey (Houghton Mifflin, 1973) (Brown Fox Books, 2012)
- Dirt Tracks to Glory: The Early Days of Stock Car Racing as Told by the Participants (Algonquin Books, 1983) (Racemaker Press, 2022)
- "50/50, The Story of Champion Race Car Driver John Paul Jr. and his Battle with Huntington's Disease" (High Desert Press, 2018)

Juvenile Nonfiction:

- Can-Am (Children's Press, 1981)
- Endurance Racing (Children's Press, 1981)
- Formula Atlantic (Children's Press, 1981)
- Formula One (Children's Press, 1981)
- Sprint Cars (Children's Press, 1981)
- Stock Cars (Children's Press, 1981)
- Super Vee (Children's Press, 1981)
- Champ Cars (Children's Press, 1982)
- The True Book of Automobiles (Children's Press, 1982)
- Trans-Am (Children's Press, 1983)
- Kart Racing (Children's Press, 1985)
- I Can Be a Race Car Driver (Children's Press, 1986)

Young Adult Mysteries by "Eric Speed"

- Mexicali 1000 (Grosset and Dunlap, 1975)
- Road Race of Champions (Grosset and Dunlap, 1975)
- GT Challenge (Grosset and Dunlap, 1976)
- Midnight Rally (Grosset and Dunlap, 1978)

== Works cited ==
- Eubanks, Georgann (2010). Literary Trails of the North Carolina Piedmont: A Guidebook. Chapel Hill: University of North Carolina Press. ISBN 9780807899526.
