= Poverty penalty =

Economic theory

The poverty penalty describes the phenomenon that poor people tend to pay more to eat, buy, and borrow than the rich. The term became widely known through a 2005 book by C. K. Prahalad, The Fortune at the Bottom of the Pyramid.

An earlier exploration of this was a 1960s sociology study published as The Poor Pay More which examined the ways in which retail patterns and a lack of consumer options allowed marginal retailers such as door-to-door salesmen, "easy credit" storefronts and the sale of installment credit agreements to extract profits from low-income buyers, with fewer options and less sophisticated consumer habits.

The impact of the poverty penalty phenomenon has been observed across a range of products and services, including energy and insurance.

== See also ==
- Cost of poverty
- Extreme poverty
- Poverty reduction
- Progress and Poverty

The factors causing poverty and suffering
