= Craig Nova =

American novelist (born 1945)

- Born: July 5, 1945 (age 81); Los Angeles, California, US
- Education: UC Berkeley; Columbia University
- Occupations: Writer, educator
- Notable work: The Good Son (1982)
- Spouse: Christina Barnes (m. 1993)
- Children: 2
- Website: Official website

Craig Nova (born July 5, 1945, in Los Angeles) is an American writer and novelist. Since 1972, he has published 14 novels and 1 autobiography, with his 15th novel, The Last Sweet Taste, slated for release on July 7, 2026. His 2002 Wetware was made into a 2018 film of the same name starring Jerry O'Connell. His writing has appeared in Esquire, The Paris Review, and The New York Times Magazine, among others. His awards include a Guggenheim Fellowship, three National Endowment for the Arts fellowships, and an American Academy and Institute of Arts and Letters Award in Literature.

== Biography ==
Nova was born in Los Angeles and raised in Hollywood, California. His father worked in the aerospace industry. Growing up, he played with the daughter of Jayne Mansfield and raced cars with Steve McQueen. At age 17, he lived with a family friend, whose father was a writer. Nova completed a BA at University of California, Berkeley and an MFA at the Columbia University's writing program.

Nova's first novel, Turkey Hash (1972), won the Harper-Saxon award in its publication year. This book was followed by The Geek (1975), which featured illustrations by Brad Holland. Nova was inspired to write The Good Son (1982), which follows a former military pilot in the aftermath of World War II, by his father-in-law, who himself was imprisoned in a German concentration camp after being shot down in combat. The novel is broken up into different "books", each narrated by a different character. The sequel, All the Dead Yale Men, was released in 2013. Nova's book Cruisers (2004) was inspired by the 1997 Colebrook Incident in New Hampshire. The Constant Heart (2012) was included in that year's New Yorker's Best Books list. As of April 2026, he has released 14 novels and 1 autobiography, with another novel slated for release in July 2026.

In addition to writing, Nova has also taught at Duke University and the University of North Carolina at Greensboro (UNCG). He was a visiting creative writing instructor at Drew University in 1975. In 2005, he was made the Class of 1949 Distinguished Professor in the Humanities at UNCG. He served on the judge panels for the 2006 National Book Awards and the 2012 PEN/Hemingway Award.

== Personal life ==
Nova is married to Christina Barnes, a graduate of MIT and a former employee of CBS News. They wed in New York City before moving to Vermont, where Nova's maternal grandfather had land, to start a family. They have two daughters, Abby and Tate. In 2004, they lived in Putney, Vermont, but have since moved to North Carolina. The couple's Hillsborough house was featured in The News & Observer in 2022.

== Awards and honors ==
- 1971: National Endowment for the Arts Fellowship
- 1972: Harper-Saxon Award, Turkey Hash
- 1975: National Endowment for the Arts Fellowship
- 1975: New York State Creative Artists Public Service Award
- 1977: Guggenheim Fellowship
- 1984: American Academy and Institute of Arts and Letters Award in Literature
- 1985: National Endowment for the Arts Fellowship
- ? O. Henry Award for short story "The Prince"

== Bibliography ==
Novels

- Turkey Hash. Harper & Row. 1972. ISBN 9780060132248.
- The Geek. Harper & Row. 1975. ISBN 9780060132095.
- Incandescence. Harper & Row. 1979. ISBN 9780060131968.
- The Good Son. Delacorte Press. 1982. ISBN 9780440029168.
- The Congressman's Daughter. Delacorte Press. 1986. ISBN 9780385294553.
- Tornado Alley. Delacorte Press. 1989. ISBN 9780440502012.
- Trombone. Grove Press. 1992. ISBN 9780802113597.
- The Book of Dreams. Ticknor and Fields. 1994. ISBN 9780395636503.
- The Universal Donor. Houghton Mifflin. 1997. ISBN 9780395709382.
- Wetware. Knopf Doubleday Publishing Group. 2002. ISBN 9781400031177.
- Cruisers. Knopf Doubleday Publishing Group. 2004. ISBN 9781400030699.
- The Informer. Crown Publishing Group. 2010. ISBN 9780307236937.
- The Constant Heart. Counterpoint. 2012. ISBN 9781619020238.
- All The Dead Yale Men. Counterpoint. 2013. ISBN 9781582438283.
- Double Solitaire: A Novel. Arcade Crimewise. 2021. ISBN 9781950691227.
- The Last Sweet Taste. Arcade Publishing. 2026. ISBN 9781648211812.

Autobiography

- Brook Trout and the Writing Life. Eno Publishers. 1999. ISBN 9780982077146.
