= Fortunes of War (film) =

- Directed by: Thierry Notz
- Written by: Mark Lee
- Produced by: Matt Salinger
- Starring: Matt Salinger
- Cinematography: Bruce Dorfman
- Edited by: Brent A. Schoenfeld
- Music by: Kennard Ramsey
- Release date: 1994
- Running time: 107 minutes
- Country: United States
- Language: English

Fortunes of War is a 1994 direct-to-video action film filmed in the Philippines directed by Thierry Notz that was produced by as well as starring Matt Salinger.

== Plot ==
Freelance international humanitarian aid worker Peter Kernan quits his work in Thailand in disgust due to the political machinations that he feels is not helping the people who deserve aid. He finds himself in a quandary as his own relief efforts have left him destitute and owing his friend Canadian diplomatic officer Carl Pimmler a large amount of money. Pimmler has realised he will never be adequately rewarded for being a minor government diplomatic officer and offers Kernan a piece of his action. Kernan will drive an army truck loaded with medical supplies into Cambodia where he will be paid in gold bullion by a local warlord. Pimmler has the power to provide the relevant documents for Kernan's mission with Pimmler's business associate Border Patrol Police Colonel Shan providing an escort of a lieutenant and a squad of soldiers in two jeeps. Accompanying Kernan will be Pimmler's wife Johanna a surgeon who has recently returned from Burma where she provided medical aid to the local populace.

Kernan faces danger from mined roads, thieves, the Royal Thai Police, the Khmer Rouge as well as from Colonel Shan and his Australian mercenary Rodger Crawley.

== Cast ==
- Matt Salinger as Peter Kernan
- Sam Jenkins as Johanna Pimmler
- Haing S. Ngor as Khoy Thuon
- Martin Sheen as Francis Labeck
- Michael Ironside as Carl Pimmler
- Michael Nouri as Father Aran
- Ronnie Lazaro as Border Patrol Lieutenant
- Frankie J. Holden as Rodger Crawley
- Vic Diaz as Colonel Shan
- Herbie Go as Khmer Rouge Officer
- John Getz as Franklin Hewitt
- Louie Katana as Corporal
- Joonee Gamboa as Sifu The Witch
- Adriana Agcaoili as Nun
