= Mary Elizabeth Smith =

American philologist (1932-2004)

- Born: August 2, 1932; Three Rivers, Michigan, U.S.
- Died: December 10, 2004 (aged 72)
- Occupation: Philologist
- Awards: Guggenheim Fellowship (1977)

Academic background
- Education: University of Michigan; Columbia University; Yale Graduate School of Arts and Sciences
- Thesis: Mixtec Place Signs: A Study of the Lienzos of Zacatepec and Jicayán (1967)
- Doctoral advisor: George Kubler

Academic work
- Discipline: Mayan studies
- Sub-discipline: Mixtec writing
- Institutions: University of New Mexico; Tulane University

Mary Elizabeth Smith (August 2, 1932 – December 10, 2004) was an American philologist. She was a professor at the University of New Mexico and Tulane University, where she was the 1993-1994 Martha and Donald Robertson Chair in Latin American Art, and she was president of the American Society for Ethnohistory from 1980 to 1981. A 1977 Guggenheim Fellow, she studied Mixtec writing and wrote such books as Las Glosas del Códice Colombino (1966), Picture Writing from Ancient Southern Mexico (1973), The Codex Tulane (1991), and The Codex López Ruiz (1998).

== Biography ==
Mary Elizabeth Smith was born on August 2, 1932, in Three Rivers, Michigan. She obtained her BA from the University of Michigan in 1954. She worked as an assistant for the American Management Association and American Exporter Publications. She later returned to post-secondary education for her graduate studies, getting an MA from Columbia University in 1960 and her PhD from Yale Graduate School of Arts and Sciences in 1966. Her doctoral dissertation Mixtec Place Signs: A Study of the Lienzos of Zacatepec and Jicayán was supervised by George Kubler.

In 1966, Smith started working at the University of New Mexico as an assistant professor, being promoted to associate professor in 1971 and full professor in 1977. In 1987, she left UNM for Tulane University, and then was the 1993-1994 Martha and Donald Robertson Chair in Latin American Art. She was president of the American Society for Ethnohistory from 1980 to 1981.

Smith studied Mixtec writing, having dedicated at least four decades of her academic career to the field. One recurring theory in her work was the "Nahuatl-speaking corridor" in the western area of La Mixteca, later confirmed by other academics. She and Alfonso Caso co-authored the Mexican Society of Anthropology's 1966 book on the Codex Columbano, with the second commentary of the book, named Las Glosas del Códice Colombino, being by her. In 1973, she wrote Picture Writing from Ancient Southern Mexico. In 1977, she was awarded a Guggenheim Fellowship for "a study of the pictorial manuscripts of the valley of Nochixtlán". In 1991, she and Ross Parmenter co-authored The Codex Tulane, a monograph on a Mixtec manuscript held in Tulane's Latin American Library. She later published another monograph in 1998, The Codex López Ruiz.

Smith died on December 10, 2004. In 2005, Tulane's Middle American Research Institute published a festschrift in her honor, Painted Books and Indigenous Knowledge in Mesoamerica: Manuscript Studies in Honor of Mary Elizabeth Smith by Elizabeth Hill Boone.

== Bibliography ==
- Las Glosas del Códice Colombino (1966)
- Picture Writing from Ancient Southern Mexico (1973)
- (with Ross Parmenter) The Codex Tulane (1991)
- The Codex López Ruiz (1998)
