= Fortunes of War (novel series) =

Six novels by Olivia Manning

- Author: Olivia Manning
- Language: English
- Series: Balkan Trilogy (The Great Fortune, The Spoilt City and Friends and Heroes); Levant Trilogy (The Danger Tree, The Battle Lost and Won and The Sum of Things)
- Publisher: Arrow Books
- Publication date: 1960
- Publication place: United Kingdom

Fortunes of War is the name given to a series of six novels by Olivia Manning that describe the experiences of a young married couple early in World War II. The series is made up of two trilogies: the books The Great Fortune (1960), The Spoilt City (1962), and Friends and Heroes (1965) comprise The Balkan Trilogy, while The Danger Tree (1977), The Battle Lost and Won (1978), and The Sum of Things (1980) comprise The Levant Trilogy. The novels were based on Manning's personal experiences during the second world war.

== Plot summary ==
The novels describe the experiences of a young married couple, Harriet and Guy Pringle, early in World War II. A lecturer and passionate Communist, Guy is attached to a British Council educational establishment in Bucharest (Romania) when war breaks out, and the couple are forced to leave the country, passing through Athens and ending up in Cairo, Egypt. Harriet is persuaded to return home by ship, but changes her mind at the last minute and goes to Damascus with friends. Guy, hearing that the ship has been torpedoed, for a time believes her to be dead, but they are eventually reunited.

The cycle also chronicles the pre-war and wartime experiences of the surrounding group of English expatriates who also find themselves on the move and the changes in Romanian society as the corrupt regime of King Carol II fails to keep Romania out of the war. It goes on to chronicle the British retreat from Greece to Egypt as the Axis forces advance in terms of its impact on the everyday lives of the expatriate community. The defence of Egypt and conditions in wartime Palestine are then described in later novels.

== List of characters ==
The leading characters, Harriet and Guy Pringle, are based on Manning herself and her husband R. D. Smith. Harriet loves Guy but has to share him with numerous hangers-on, as Guy loves everybody he meets. His character is outgoing and generous, while hers is wistful and introspective.

Other major characters in the novels include:

- Prince Yakimov, an Englishman of noble Russian and Irish descent who, though likable, sponges off the rest of the expatriate community. Manning has said that the scrounging Prince Yakimov is based in the Fitzrovian novelist Julian MacLaren-Ross. (Both are distinguished by an unusual overcoat in which they are always dressed).
- "Dobbie" Dobson, a diplomat whom Guy and Harriet encounter in multiple places.
- Clarence Lawson, a colleague of Guy's in Bucharest. An embittered cynic and moper, he is employed by the British propaganda bureau and on relief to Polish refugees.
- Sophie, an attractive but manipulative young woman, part Rumanian and part Jewish. She hopes to acquire a British passport by marrying Guy.
- Dubedat, an English elementary school teacher and bohemian pacifist 'simple lifer', who was hitchhiking his way around the Balkans when war broke out. Working class and a scouser.
- David Boyd, a part-time lecturer and an expert on Romanian history and politics employed by the British Embassy. He is a close friend and a Marxist political ally of Guy.
- Klein, a Jewish economist refugee. He has found temporary employment as an advisor to the Romanian government and is a source of news of its intrigues.
- Foxy Leverett, a diplomat who is also working for the British secret service. He is murdered by the fascist Iron Guard in Bucharest.
- Bernard Dugdale, an English diplomat who passes through Bucharest on his way to Ankara.
- Sasha Drucker, a Jewish fugitive, the son of a wealthy banking family.
- Professor Inchcape, an academic attached to the British Council.
- Bella Niculescu, a condescending but sometimes helpful friend of Harriet's. A wealthy British expatriate who has married a Bucharest native, Nikko.
- Professor Lord Pinkrose, a pompous visiting lecturer, based on the real life Edward Plunkett, Lord Dunsany
- Toby Lush, an unqualified English teacher looking for work.
- Edwina Little, a pretty, rather empty-headed young woman who shares a Cairo flat with Dobson and the Pringles.
- Charles Warden, a young officer who becomes infatuated with Harriet in Athens.
- Simon Boulderstone, a young officer who encounters Harriet on first arriving in Egypt, and who is wounded at the Second Battle of El Alamein.
- Lady Angela Hooper, a wealthy woman initially married to a nobleman. She has a nervous breakdown after her son is killed by a mortar shell.
- Aiden Pratt, a successful pre-war West End stage actor, now conscripted into the pay corps in Damascus, who befriends Guy and Harriet.
- Bill Castlebar, an occasional poet and lecturer; lover of Angela Hooper.
- Mortimer, a woman serving in the British army assigned to drive supply trucks from Egypt to Syria.
- Major Lister, a British army officer stationed in Jerusalem. A stout, depressed melancholic.

== Reception ==
Anthony Burgess described Fortunes of War as "the finest fictional record of the war produced by a British writer". He considered the first three volumes to be "probably the most important long work of fiction written by a woman since the war" and the character of Guy Pringle to be "one of the most fully created male leads in contemporary fiction.... He is a sort of civilization in himself".

== Adaptations ==
=== Television ===
The novels were adapted for television by the BBC and available in the US on Masterpiece Theatre in 1987, starring Kenneth Branagh as Guy and Emma Thompson as Harriet. Other stars included Ronald Pickup, Robert Stephens, Alan Bennett and Rupert Graves.

=== Radio ===
In 1974, The Balkan Trilogy was adapted in three parts by Eric Ewens and produced by John Tydeman for the BBC. The episodes were transmitted weekly from 9–23 September 1974 on BBC Radio 4. Harriet was played by Anna Massey, Guy by Jack Shepherd. Also: Aubrey Woods (Yakimov), John Rye (Clarence), Denis McCarthy (McCann), Manning Wilson (Inchcape), Godfrey Kenton (Woolley). The Levant Trilogy was adapted by Eric Ewens and produced by John Tydeman for the BBC, and transmitted weekly 23 November to 7 December 1981 with Anna Massey and Jack Shepherd again in the starring roles.

From 27 January 2008, the novel was adapted by Lin Coghlan in six one-hour episodes as the Classic Serial on BBC Radio 4. This version featured Khalid Abdalla as Guy and Honeysuckle Weeks as the young Harriet, with Joanna Lumley as the older Harriet, who narrates. Other cast included James Fleet (Yakimov), John Rowe (Inchcape), Alex Wyndham (Clarence), Sam Dale (Dobson), John Dougall (Galpin), Carolyn Pickles (Bella), Peter Marinker (Drucker), Joseph Arkley (Sasha), Simon Treves (Toby Lush), Ben Crowe (Dubedat), and Laura Molyneux (Despina). The adaptation was directed by Colin Guthrie and Marc Beeby.
