= Nicholas Winograd =

American chemist

Nicholas Winograd is an American chemist, currently the Evan Pugh University Professor at Pennsylvania State University and an Elected Fellow of the American Association for the Advancement of Science.
