= Fortunes of War (TV series) =

1987 BBC TV series

- Cover of a DVD of the series
- Genre: Drama
- Based on: Fortunes of War by Olivia Manning
- Written by: Alan Plater
- Directed by: James Cellan Jones
- Starring: Kenneth Branagh; Emma Thompson; Ronald Pickup; Robert Stephens; Alan Bennett; Rupert Graves
- Composer: Richard Holmes
- Country of origin: United Kingdom
- Original language: English
- No. of seasons: 1
- No. of episodes: 7

Production
- Producer: Betty Willingale
- Production locations: Greece (1 month), Egypt (2 months), Yugoslavia (2 months), Ealing Studios (interior shots)
- Cinematography: David Feig; John Record
- Editor: Tariq Anwar
- Running time: 60 minutes (per episode)

Original release
- Network: BBC1, in association with WGBH-Boston and Primetime Television
- Release: 11 October – 22 November 1987

Fortunes of War is a 1987 BBC television adaptation of Olivia Manning's cycle of novels Fortunes of War. It stars Kenneth Branagh as Guy Pringle, lecturer in English Literature in Bucharest during the early part of the Second World War, and Emma Thompson as his wife Harriet. Kenneth Branagh and Emma Thompson met filming the TV series and married in real life. Other cast members included Ronald Pickup, Robert Stephens, Alan Bennett, Philip Madoc and Rupert Graves.

== Cast ==
- Emma Thompson as Harriet Pringle
- Kenneth Branagh as Guy Pringle
- Charles Kay as Dobson
- Mark Drewry as Dubedat
- Ronald Pickup as Prince Yakimov
- Alan Bennett as Lord Pinkrose
- Harry Burton as Sasha Drucker
- Rupert Graves as Simon Boulderstone
- James Villiers as Inchcape
- Robert Stephens as Castlebar
- Greg Hicks as Aidan Pratt
- Ciaran Madden as Angela Hooper
- Diana Hardcastle as Edwina Little
- Claire Oberman as Mortimer
- Esmond Knight as Liversage
- Michael Cochrane as Clifford
- Richard Clifford as Clarence Lawson
- Caroline Langrishe as Bella Niculescu
- Christopher Strauli as Toby Lush
- Desmond McNamara as Galpin
- Philip Madoc as Freddi von Flugel
- Peter Tilbury as Alan Frewen

== Episodes ==
=== The Balkans: September 1939 ===
Newlyweds Guy and Harriet Pringle arrive in Bucharest, as does the impoverished Prince Yakimov, who takes a temporary job as a journalist for a British newspaper to save himself from destitution. Harriet is introduced to her fellow expatriates (making friends with the middle-class Bella, who has married a wealthy local man) and to Guy's Romanian friend and admirer Sophie. Their life is interrupted by the assassination of the Romanian prime minister Călinescu and Nazi Germany's invasion of Poland. Rumours fly of a German invasion of Romania and Guy, though absorbed in his work and organising social events, is concerned about the family of a Jewish student of his, Sasha Drucker, given the antisemitic Romanian regime.

=== Romania: January 1940 ===
Commander Sheppey holds a clandestine meeting to plot against the authorities. Guy feels guilty about not being on active service and is determined to do something productive. When he cancels a lunch arrangement with Harriet, she is worried over his whereabouts. Clarence Lawson, a colleague of Guy, entertains a lonely Harriet. Concern for Sasha Drucker and his family intensifies when they go missing. Harriet takes in a stray cat. When Guy and Harriet spend a weekend in the mountains, the feckless Yakimov is left looking after their flat, with tragic consequences. Guy has ambitious plans to stage a production of Troilus and Cressida but casting causes dissent. During the after-show celebration, the British envoy Dobson makes a disturbing announcement about the political situation. Harriet and Guy find Sasha Drucker, who is now in desperate need of their assistance.

=== Romania: June 1940 ===
The fascist Iron Guard increase their power and the British fall out of favour with the Romanians. Sasha remains in hiding at the Pringles' home and becomes friends with Harriet. Sophie attempts to lure Guy to her apartment, and he finally sees through her. Another expatriate, Toby Lush, arrives looking for a job at the university. Yakimov puts his life at risk for the sake of a good meal and a bottle of wine. When Dobson announces that the British Legation recommends that everyone should return home, he receives a mixed reaction. As a result of Yakimov's impropriety, Guy finds himself a wanted man. Harriet attends Sasha's father's trial but has difficulty giving a true account of events. Tension mounts as the fascists take over, and the Pringles, with the help of Clarence Lawson, try to smuggle Sasha out to safety. In the midst of chaos, British academic Lord Pinkrose arrives to give a lecture on Byron. As the violence escalates, the expatriates plan their escape routes.

=== Greece: October 1940 ===
A despondent Harriet arrives in Athens, where she is overjoyed to see Yakimov at a cafe. They find employment at the British Information Office but when Pinkrose begins to work there, the mood turns sour. Harriet meets a young soldier, Charles Warden, who is quite taken with her. She considers having an affair with him but as she is going to his hotel room on the final afternoon before he must leave, she sees Sasha Drucker on the stairs. Sasha is convinced that the Pringles turned him in; Harriet assures him they did not. The delay makes her think better of her relationship with Warden. Guy applies for a lecturing post at the English School but is dismayed to find he is not the first in the queue. When Athens comes under enemy fire, Yakimov lights a cigarette outside during the blackout and is shot dead by a sentry. The remaining group leave Athens by sea for Cairo.

=== Egypt: April 1941 ===
After their unceremonious arrival in Cairo, Guy and Harriet are forced to stay in an old brothel. Guy struggles to find work when it emerges that an old adversary is now in charge of the English School. When Guy has to go to Alexandria, Harriet moves into 'Garden City' with Dobson. A naive young officer, Simon Boulderstone, goes in search of his brother Hugo and befriends Harriet. Harriet is also introduced to eccentric Mr Liversage, flirtatious Edwina and authoritative Mr Clifford. Harriet and Simon visit the Giza and Djoser pyramids with Liversage and Clifford and climb them together. Harriet warns a naive Simon that the Egyptians dislike the British because the British have exploited them for years for control of the Suez Canal. Simon doesn't understand until he, Harriet and Mortimer, a female soldier, visit a live sex show, at which he is disgusted. Harriet and Simon also meet the Hoopers, a rich couple whose son has just been killed by a land mine. The Germans close in and Simon must go off to fight.

=== Egypt: September 1942 ===
To help Simon recover from the death of his brother, he is taken under the wing of those at 'Garden City'. Guy is enthusiastic about two new teachers he has employed. Simon becomes a hero in a desert skirmish and is promoted to liaison officer. Angela Hooper leaves her husband and takes up with Bill Castlebar, a poet and married man. When his wife Mona returns, Angela and Harriet go to Luxor. However, there is an outbreak of cholera and Angela leaves. Harriet stays and sees Aiden Pratt, a young officer who was once a great actor in London. She thinks he is in love with her because he implores her and Guy to come and visit him in Damascus. He also tells her a horrific story of his time on an ocean liner after he declared himself a conscientious objector to the war. The ship was torpedoed and all the evacuated children died. He then decided to fight. Lord Pinkrose is determined to give his lecture on Byron, and Guy arranges it. Some Egyptian nationalists confuse him with another English aristocrat and shoot him at the podium. Harriet contracts dysentery when she comes back from Luxor and has to stay in hospital for several weeks. Guy pays her little attention and continues rehearsing his newest play. Harriet decides to go back to England. Simon is being driven to his new post when the Jeep stops at a WC and his driver is killed by a hidden mine. Simon's legs are temporarily paralysed as a result of the incident. Harriet leaves Guy at the zoo to get on the boat alone, but at the last minute sees Mortimer and begs her to take her to Damascus. The episode ends with Dobson reading that the boat Harriet was supposed to be on was torpedoed and there were no survivors.

=== The Middle East: January 1943 ===
As Guy struggles to cope with his presumed loss of Harriet, Simon Boulderstone starts his painful and slow road to recovery. Harriet makes a new friend and rediscovers old ones as she takes in the sights of Damascus, whilst Aiden Pratt's feelings of rejection by Guy bring about unhappy consequences; Aiden is a closet homosexual. Harriet, discovering that Guy thinks her dead, is rushed back to Egypt by Bill Castlebar. On their return, Castlebar collapses and dies later in hospital; Angela is desolate when Bill's wife takes on the funeral arrangements. Harriet and Guy are reunited and they and Simon climb the pyramids together.

== Awards ==
=== Wins ===
- BAFTAs 1988
  - Best Actress – Emma Thompson (jointly for this series and "Tutti Frutti").
  - Best Costume Design – Christine Rawlins
  - Best Design – Tim Harvey

=== Nominations ===
- BAFTAs 1988
  - Best Actor – Kenneth Branagh (For the episode "The Lady's Not for Burning".)
  - Best Drama Series – Betty Willingale and James Cellan Jones
  - Best Film Editor – Tariq Anwar
  - Best Film Sound – Terry Elms, Ken Hains, Judith Robson and Kim Houldin
  - Best Make Up – Elizabeth Rowell
  - Best Original Television Music – Richard Holmes
