= Sandra Stashik =

American architectural lighting designer and engineer

Sandra Stashik is an American architectural lighting designer and professional engineer, noted for her involvement in the art and science of illumination and recognized for her involvement in the development of standards and publications, public outreach, and lighting education. Stashik was a Principal at the Philadelphia based lighting design firm, Grenald Waldron Associates before joining Acuity Brands Lighting.

Stashik presented at the Fifth Annual U.S. Department of Energy (DOE) Solid-State Lighting Market Introduction Workshop on the applications and benefits of solid-state lighting technologies in lighting design. She also served as a judge in the Solar Decathlon, a biennial competition organized by the DOE.

She contributed to the publication of several lighting recommended practices by the Illuminating Engineering Society (IES) including ANSI/IES RP-43-22: Lighting for Exterior Applications and ANSI/IES LP-2-20: Designing Quality Lighting for People in Outdoor Environment. She was an editor for the 8th Edition of the IES Lighting Handbook for Reference and Application and served on the IES Board of Directors.

== Notable projects ==
- Benjamin Franklin Bridge
- Falls Bridge
- Montgomery, Alabama Renaissance Hotel and Convention Center
- Richmond, Virginia City Center Streetscape

== Notable awards ==
- Illumination Engineering Society Distinguished Service Award (2018)
- Illumination Engineering Society Fellow (1993)
- Illumination Engineering Society Philadelphia Chapter Service Award (1992)
