= Nonimaging optics =

Branch of optics

Nonimaging optics (also called anidolic optics) is a branch of optics that is concerned with the optimal transfer of light radiation between a source and a target. Unlike traditional imaging optics, the techniques involved do not attempt to form an image of the source; instead an optimized optical system for optimal radiative transfer from a source to a target is desired.

== Applications ==
The two design problems that nonimaging optics solves better than imaging optics are:

- solar energy concentration: maximizing the amount of energy applied to a receiver, typically a solar cell or a thermal receiver
- illumination: controlling the distribution of light, typically so it is "evenly" spread over some areas and completely blocked from other areas

Typical variables to be optimized at the target include the total radiant flux, the angular distribution of optical radiation, and the spatial distribution of optical radiation. These variables on the target side of the optical system often must be optimized while simultaneously considering the collection efficiency of the optical system at the source.

=== Solar energy concentration ===
For a given concentration, nonimaging optics provide the widest possible acceptance angles and, therefore, are the most appropriate for use in solar concentration as, for example, in concentrated photovoltaics. When compared to "traditional" imaging optics (such as parabolic reflectors or fresnel lenses), the main advantages of nonimaging optics for concentrating solar energy are:

- wider acceptance angles resulting in higher tolerances (and therefore higher efficiencies) for:
  - less precise tracking
  - imperfectly manufactured optics
  - imperfectly assembled components
  - movements of the system due to wind
  - finite stiffness of the supporting structure
  - deformation due to aging
  - capture of circumsolar radiation
  - other imperfections in the system
- higher solar concentrations
  - smaller solar cells (in concentrated photovoltaics)
  - higher temperatures (in concentrated solar thermal)
  - lower thermal losses (in concentrated solar thermal)
  - widen the applications of concentrated solar power, for example to solar lasers
- possibility of a uniform illumination of the receiver
  - improve reliability and efficiency of the solar cells (in concentrated photovoltaics)
  - improve heat transfer (in concentrated solar thermal)
- design flexibility: different kinds of optics with different geometries can be tailored for different applications

Also, for low concentrations, the very wide acceptance angles of nonimaging optics can avoid solar tracking altogether or limit it to a few positions a year.

The main disadvantage of nonimaging optics when compared to parabolic reflectors or Fresnel lenses is that, for high concentrations, they typically have one more optical surface, slightly decreasing efficiency. That, however, is only noticeable when the optics are aiming perfectly towards the Sun, which is typically not the case because of imperfections in practical systems.

=== Illumination optics ===
Examples of nonimaging optical devices include optical light guides, nonimaging reflectors, nonimaging lenses or a combination of these devices. Common applications of nonimaging optics include many areas of illumination engineering (lighting). Examples of modern implementations of nonimaging optical designs include automotive headlamps, LCD backlights, illuminated instrument panel displays, fiber optic illumination devices, LED lights, projection display systems and luminaires.

When compared to "traditional" design techniques, nonimaging optics has the following advantages for illumination:

- better handling of extended sources
- more compact optics
- color mixing capabilities
- combination of light sources and light distribution to different places
- well suited to be used with increasingly popular LED light sources
- tolerance to variations in the relative position of light source and optic

Examples of nonimaging illumination optics using solar energy are anidolic lighting or solar pipes.

=== Other applications ===
Modern portable and wearable optical devices, and systems of small sizes and low weights may require nanotechnology. This issue may be addressed by nonimaging metaoptics, which uses metalenses and metamirrors to deal with the optimal transfer of light energy.

Collecting light emitted by high-energy particle collisions with a scintillator using the fewest photomultiplier tubes.

Collecting luminescent radiation in photon upconversion devices with the compound parabolic concentrator being to-date the most promising geometrical optics collector.

Some of the design methods for nonimaging optics are also finding application in imaging devices, for example some with ultra-high numerical aperture.

== Theory ==
Early academic research in nonimaging optical mathematics seeking closed form solutions was first published in textbook form in a 1978 book. A modern textbook illustrating the depth and breadth of research and engineering in this area was published in 2004. A thorough introduction to this field was published in 2008.

Special applications of nonimaging optics such as Fresnel lenses for solar concentration or solar concentration in general have also been published, although this last reference by O'Gallagher describes mostly the work developed some decades ago. Other publications include book chapters.

Imaging optics can concentrate sunlight to, at most, the same flux found at the surface of the Sun. Nonimaging optics have been demonstrated to concentrate sunlight to 84,000 times the ambient intensity of sunlight, exceeding the flux found at the surface of the Sun, and approaching the theoretical (2nd law of thermodynamics) limit of heating objects to the temperature of the Sun's surface.

The simplest way to design nonimaging optics is called "the method of strings", based on the edge ray principle. Other more advanced methods were developed starting in the early 1990s that can better handle extended light sources than the edge-ray method. These were developed primarily to solve the design problems related to solid state automobile headlamps and complex illumination systems. One of these advanced design methods is the simultaneous multiple surface design method (SMS). The 2D SMS design method (U.S. patent 6,639,733) is described in detail in the aforementioned textbooks. The 3D SMS design method (U.S. patent 7,460,985) was developed in 2003 by a team of optical scientists at Light Prescriptions Innovators.

=== Edge ray principle ===
In simple terms, the edge ray principle states that if the light rays coming from the edges of the source are redirected towards the edges of the receiver, this will ensure that all light rays coming from the inner points in the source will end up on the receiver. There is no condition on image formation, the only goal is to transfer the light from the source to the target.

Figure Edge ray principle on the right illustrates this principle. A lens collects light from a source S_{1}S_{2} and redirects it towards a receiver R_{1}R_{2}.

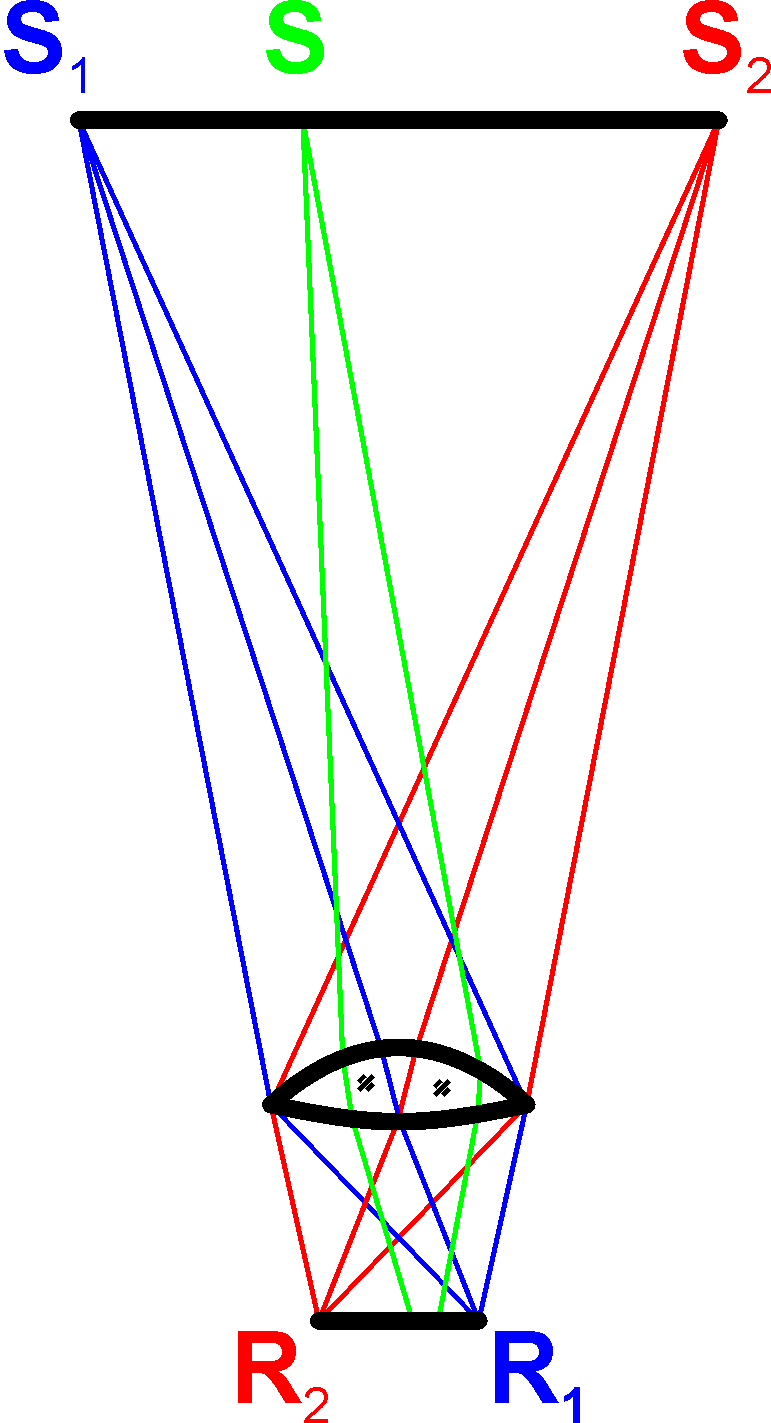
Edge ray principle

The lens has two optical surfaces and, therefore, it is possible to design it (using the SMS design method) so that the light rays coming from the edge S_{1} of the source are redirected towards edge R_{1} of the receiver, as indicated by the blue rays. By symmetry, the rays coming from edge S_{2} of the source are redirected towards edge R_{2} of the receiver, as indicated by the red rays. The rays coming from an inner point S in the source are redirected towards the target, but they are not concentrated onto a point and, therefore, no image is formed.

Actually, if we consider a point P on the top surface of the lens, a ray coming from S_{1} through P will be redirected towards R_{1}. Also a ray coming from S_{2} through P will be redirected towards R_{2}. A ray coming through P from an inner point S in the source will be redirected towards an inner point of the receiver. This lens then guarantees that all light from the source crossing it will be redirected towards the receiver. However, no image of the source is formed on the target. Imposing the condition of image formation on the receiver would imply using more optical surfaces, making the optic more complicated, but would not improve light transfer between source and target (since all light is already transferred). For that reason nonimaging optics are simpler and more efficient than imaging optics in transferring radiation from a source to a target.

=== Design methods ===
Nonimaging optics devices are obtained using different methods. The most important are: the flow-line or Winston-Welford design method, the SMS or Miñano-Benitez design method and the Miñano design method using Poisson brackets. The first (flow-line) is probably the most used, although the second (SMS) has proven very versatile, resulting in a wide variety of optics. The third has remained in the realm of theoretical optics and has not found real world application to date. Often optimization is also used.

Typically optics have refractive and reflective surfaces and light travels through media of different refractive indices as it crosses the optic. In those cases a quantity called optical path length (OPL) may be defined as $S = \sum_i n_i d_i$ where index i indicates different ray sections between successive deflections (refractions or reflections), n_{i} is the refractive index and d_{i} the distance in each section i of the ray path.

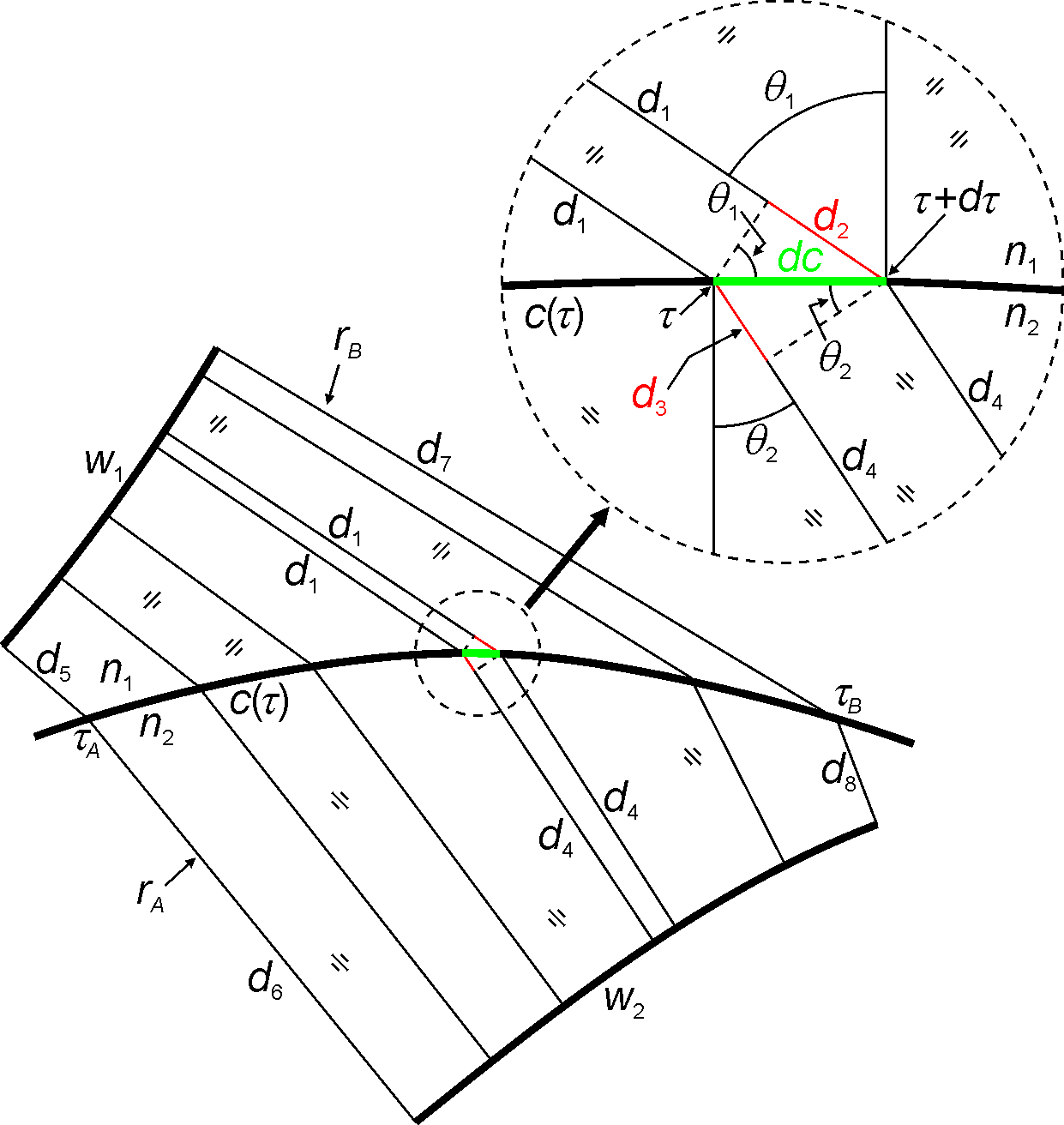
Constant optical path length

The OPL is constant between wavefronts. This can be seen for refraction in the figure "constant OPL" to the right. It shows a separation c(τ) between two media of refractive indices n_{1} and n_{2}, where c(τ) is described by a parametric equation with parameter τ. Also shown are a set of rays perpendicular to wavefront w_{1} and traveling in the medium of refractive index n_{1}. These rays refract at c(τ) into the medium of refractive index n_{2} in directions perpendicular to wavefront w_{2}. Ray r_{A} crosses c at point c(τ_{A}) and, therefore, ray r_{A} is identified by parameter τ_{A} on c. Likewise, ray r_{B} is identified by parameter τ_{B} on c. Ray r_{A} has optical path length S(τ_{A}) = n_{1}d_{5} + n_{2}d_{6}. Also, ray r_{B} has optical path length S(τ_{B}) = n_{1}d_{7} + n_{2}d_{8}. The difference in optical path length for rays r_{A} and r_{B} is given by:

$$\begin{align}
S(\tau_\mathrm{B}) &- S(\tau_\mathrm{A}) \\
&= \int_\mathrm{A}^\mathrm{B} dS = \int_{\tau_\mathrm{A}}^{\tau_\mathrm{B}} \frac{dS}{d\tau}d\tau \\
&= \int_{\tau_\mathrm{A}}^{\tau_\mathrm{B}} \frac{S(\tau + d \tau) - S(\tau)}{(\tau + d\tau) - \tau}d\tau\,.
\end{align}$$

In order to calculate the value of this integral, we evaluate S(τ + dτ) − S(τ), again with the help of the same figure. We have S(τ) = n_{1}d_{1} + n_{2}(d_{3} + d_{4}) and S(τ + dτ) = n_{1}(d_{1} + d_{2}) + n_{2}d_{4}. These expressions can be rewritten as S(τ) = n_{1}d_{1} + n_{2}dc sinθ_{2} + n_{2}d_{4} and S(τ + dτ) = n_{1}d_{1} + n_{1}dc sinθ_{1} + n_{2}d_{4}. From the law of refraction n_{1}sinθ_{1} = n_{2}sinθ_{2} and therefore S(τ + dτ) = S(τ), leading to S(τ_{A}) = S(τ_{B}). Since these may be arbitrary rays crossing c, it may be concluded that the optical path length between w_{1} and w_{2} is the same for all rays perpendicular to incoming wavefront w_{1} and outgoing wavefront w_{2}.

Similar conclusions may be drawn for the case of reflection, only in this case n_{1} = n_{2}. This relationship between rays and wavefronts is valid in general.

==== Flow-line design method ====
The flow-line (or Winston-Welford) design method typically leads to optics which guide the light confining it between two reflective surfaces. The best known of these devices is the CPC (Compound Parabolic Concentrator).

These types of optics may be obtained, for example, by applying the edge ray of nonimaging optics to the design of mirrored optics, as shown in figure "CEC" on the right. It is composed of two elliptical mirrors e_{1} with foci S_{1} and R_{1} and its symmetrical e_{2} with foci S_{2} and R_{2}.

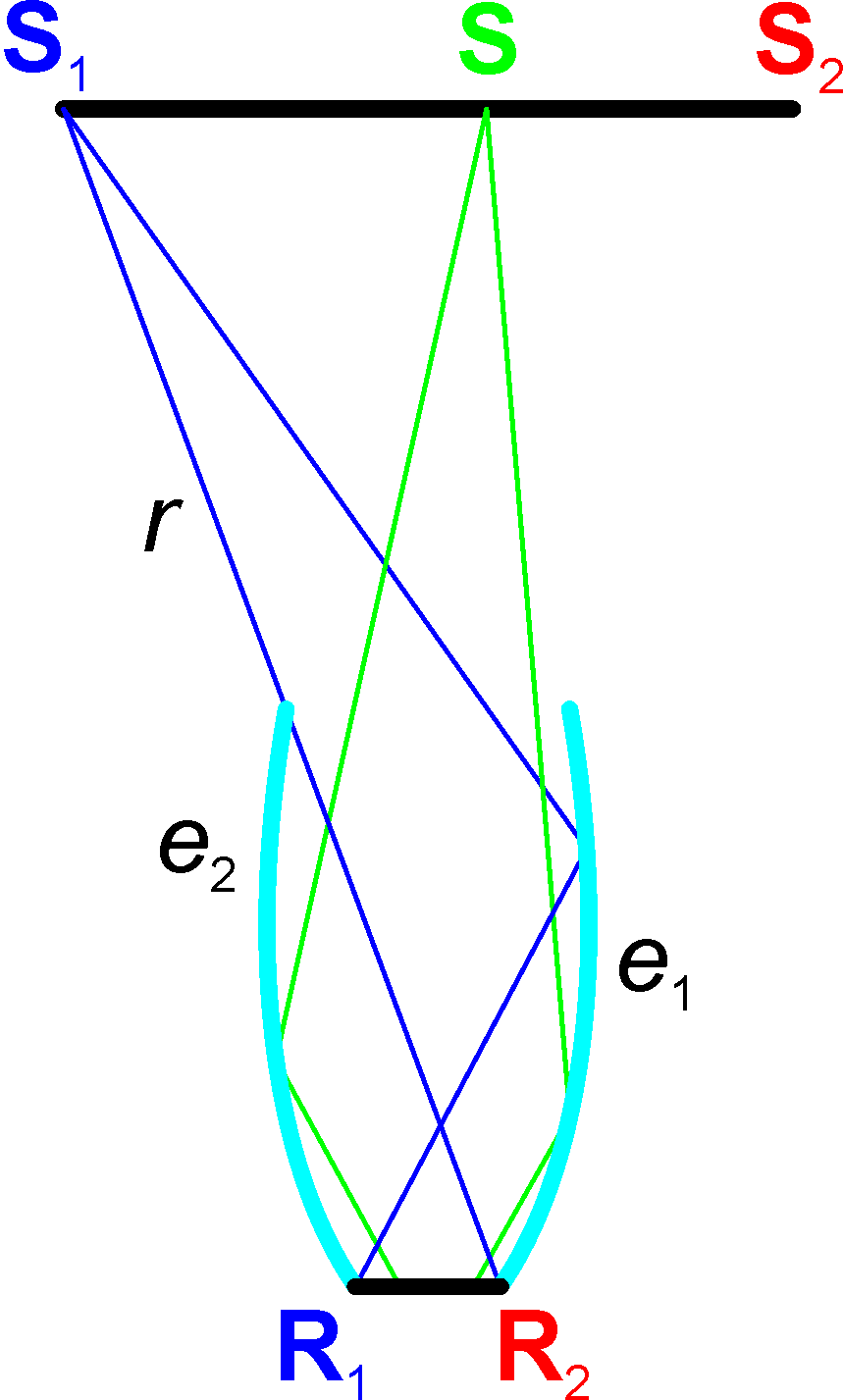
CEC

Mirror e_{1} redirects the rays coming from the edge S_{1} of the source towards the edge R_{1} of the receiver and, by symmetry, mirror e_{2} redirects the rays coming from the edge S_{2} of the source towards the edge R_{2} of the receiver. This device does not form an image of the source S_{1}S_{2} on the receiver R_{1}R_{2} as indicated by the green rays coming from a point S in the source that end up on the receiver but are not focused onto an image point. Mirror e_{2} starts at the edge R_{1} of the receiver since leaving a gap between mirror and receiver would allow light to escape between the two. Also, mirror e_{2} ends at ray r connecting S_{1} and R_{2} since cutting it short would prevent it from capturing as much light as possible, but extending it above r would shade light coming from S_{1} and its neighboring points of the source. The resulting device is called a CEC (Compound Elliptical Concentrator).

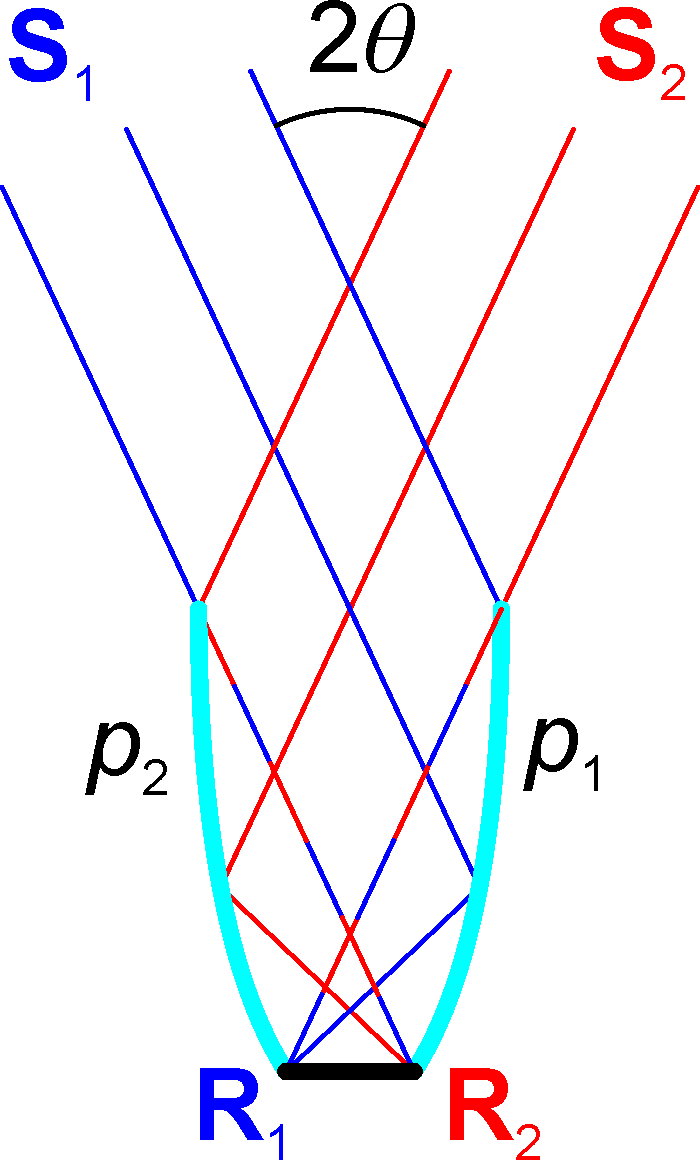
CPC

A particular case of this design happens when the source S_{1}S_{2} becomes infinitely large and moves to an infinite distance. Then the rays coming from S_{1} become parallel rays and the same for those coming from S_{2} and the elliptical mirrors e_{1} and e_{2} converge to parabolic mirrors p_{1} and p_{2}. The resulting device is called a CPC (Compound Parabolic Concentrator), and shown in the "CPC" figure on the left. CPCs are the most common seen nonimaging optics. They are often used to demonstrate the difference between Imaging optics and nonimaging optics.

When seen from the CPC, the incoming radiation (emitted from the infinite source at an infinite distance) subtends an angle ±θ (total angle 2θ). This is called the acceptance angle of the CPC. The reason for this name can be appreciated in the figure "rays showing the acceptance angle" on the right. An incoming ray r_{1} at an angle θ to the vertical (coming from the edge of the infinite source) is redirected by the CPC towards the edge R_{1} of the receiver.

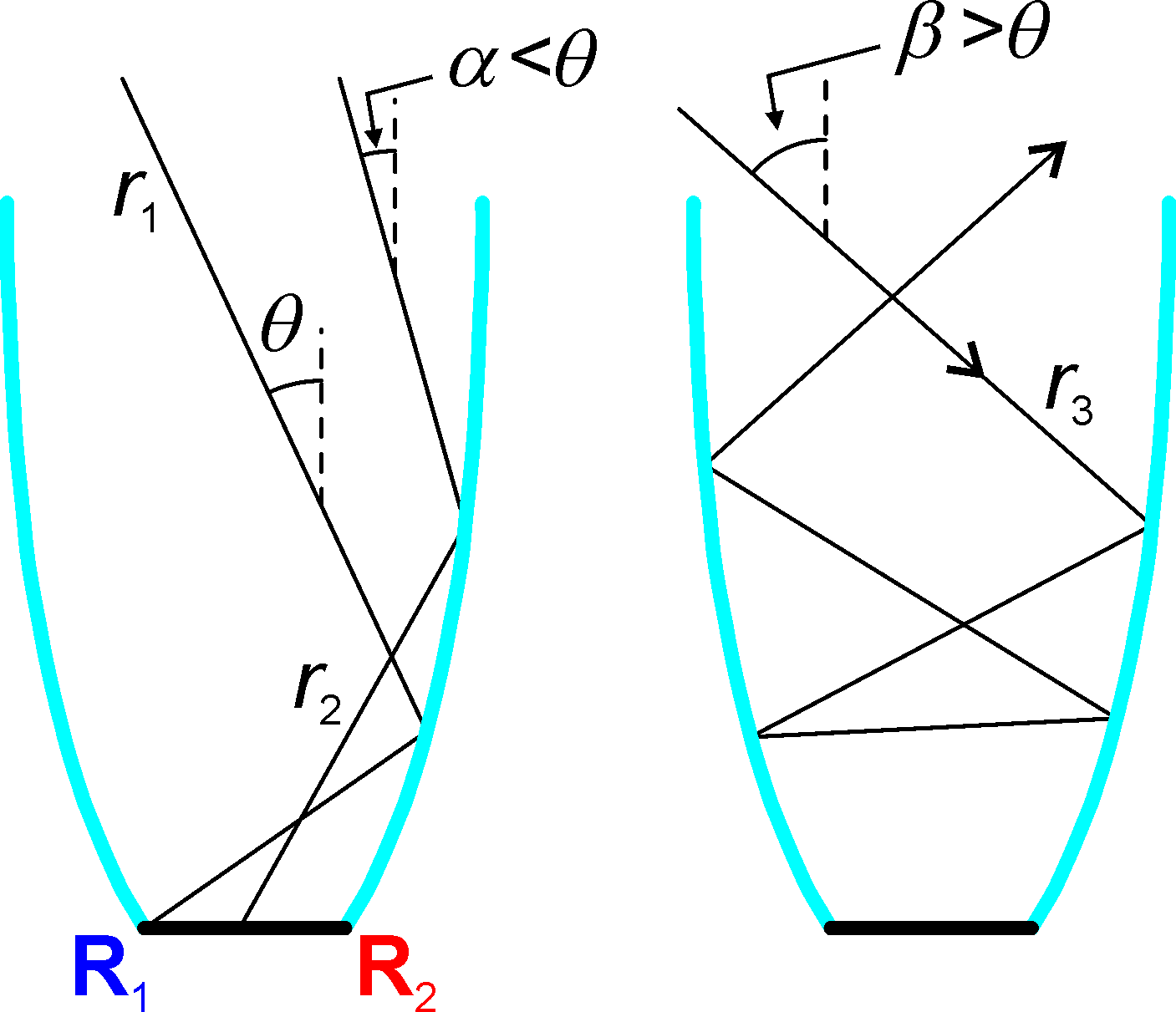
Rays showing the acceptance angle

Another ray r_{2} at an angle α<θ to the vertical (coming from an inner point of the infinite source) is redirected towards an inner point of the receiver. However, a ray r_{3} at an angle β>θ to the vertical (coming from a point outside the infinite source) bounces around inside the CPC until it is rejected by it. Therefore, only the light inside the acceptance angle ±θ is captured by the optic; light outside it is rejected.

The ellipses of a CEC can be obtained by the (pins and) string method, as shown in the figure "string method" on the left. A string of constant length is attached to edge point S_{1} of the source and edge point R_{1} of the receiver.

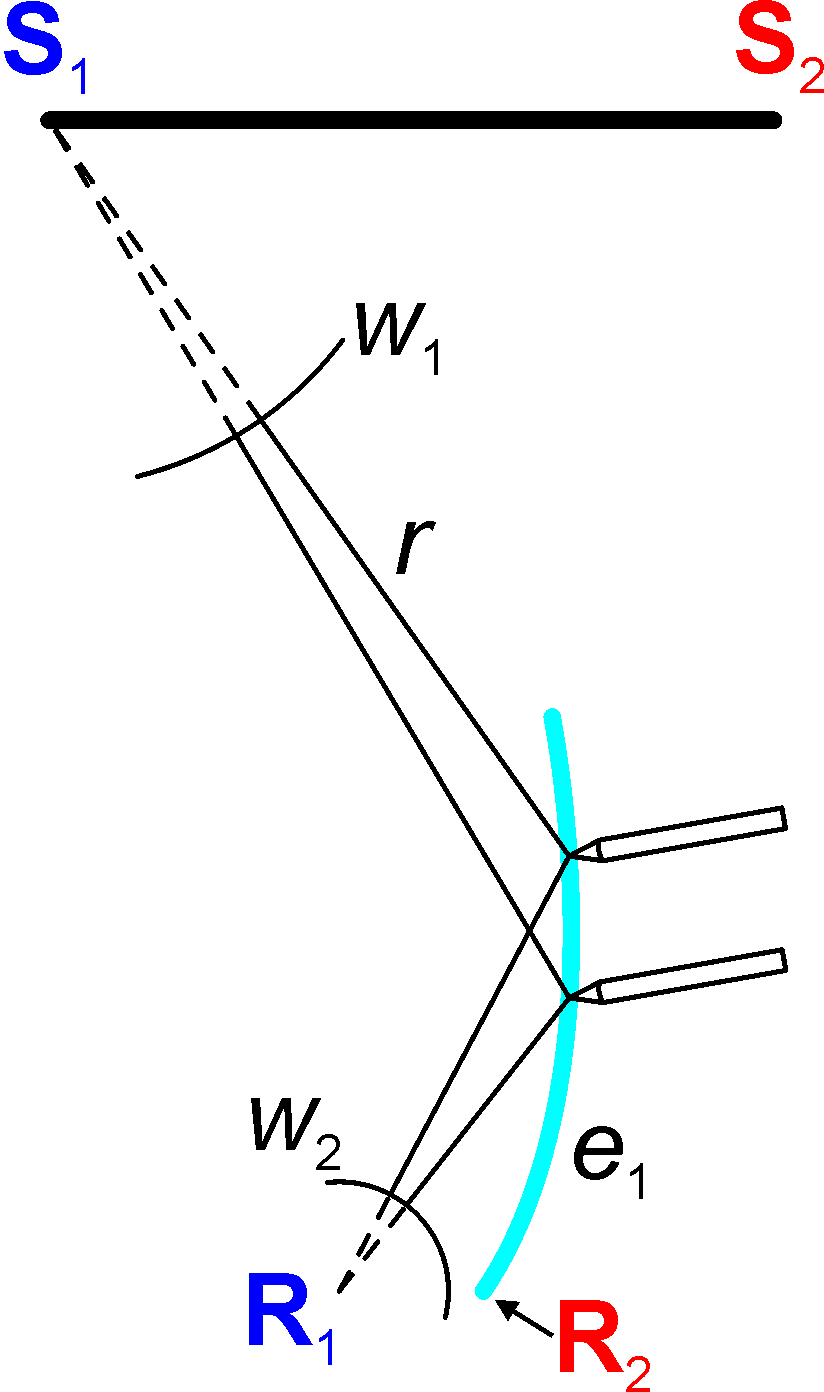
String method

The string is kept stretched while moving a pencil up and down, drawing the elliptical mirror e_{1}. We can now consider a wavefront w_{1} as a circle centered at S_{1}. This wavefront is perpendicular to all rays coming out of S_{1} and the distance from S_{1} to w_{1} is constant for all its points. The same is valid for wavefront w_{2} centered at R_{1}. The distance from w_{1} to w_{2} is then constant for all light rays reflected at e_{1} and these light rays are perpendicular to both, incoming wavefront w_{1} and outgoing wavefront w_{2}.

Optical path length (OPL) is constant between wavefronts. When applied to nonimaging optics, this result extends the string method to optics with both refractive and reflective surfaces. Figure "DTIRC" (Dielectric Total Internal Reflection Concentrator) on the left shows one such example.

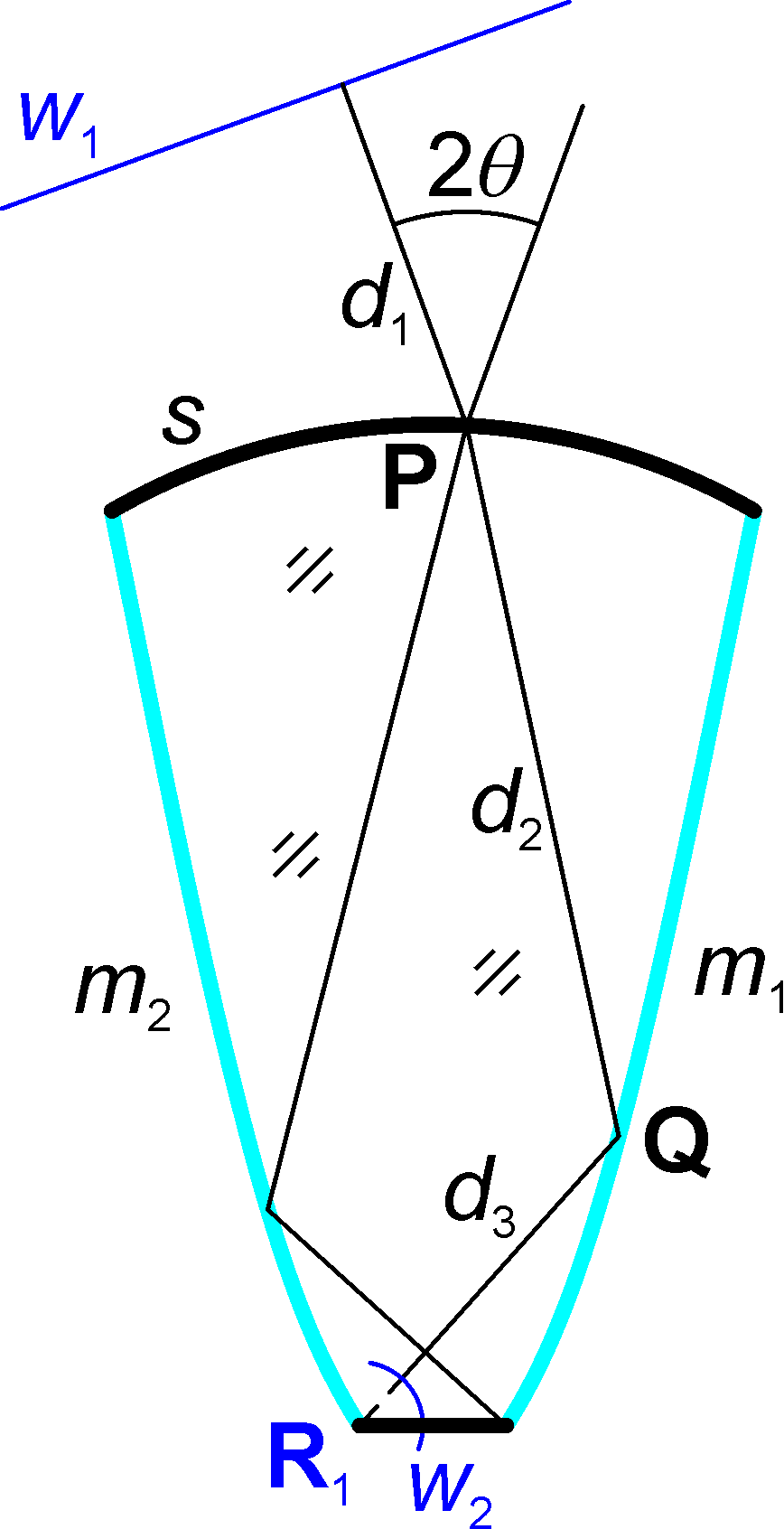
DTIRC

The shape of the top surface s is prescribed, for example, as a circle. Then the lateral wall m_{1} is calculated by the condition of constant optical path length S=d_{1}+n d_{2}+n d_{3} where d_{1} is the distance between incoming wavefront w_{1} and point P on the top surface s, d_{2} is the distance between P and Q and d_{3} the distance between Q and outgoing wavefront w_{2}, which is circular and centered at R_{1}. Lateral wall m_{2} is symmetrical to m_{1}. The acceptance angle of the device is 2θ.

These optics are called flow-line optics and the reason for that is illustrated in figure "CPC flow-lines" on the right. It shows a CPC with an acceptance angle 2θ, highlighting one of its inner points P.

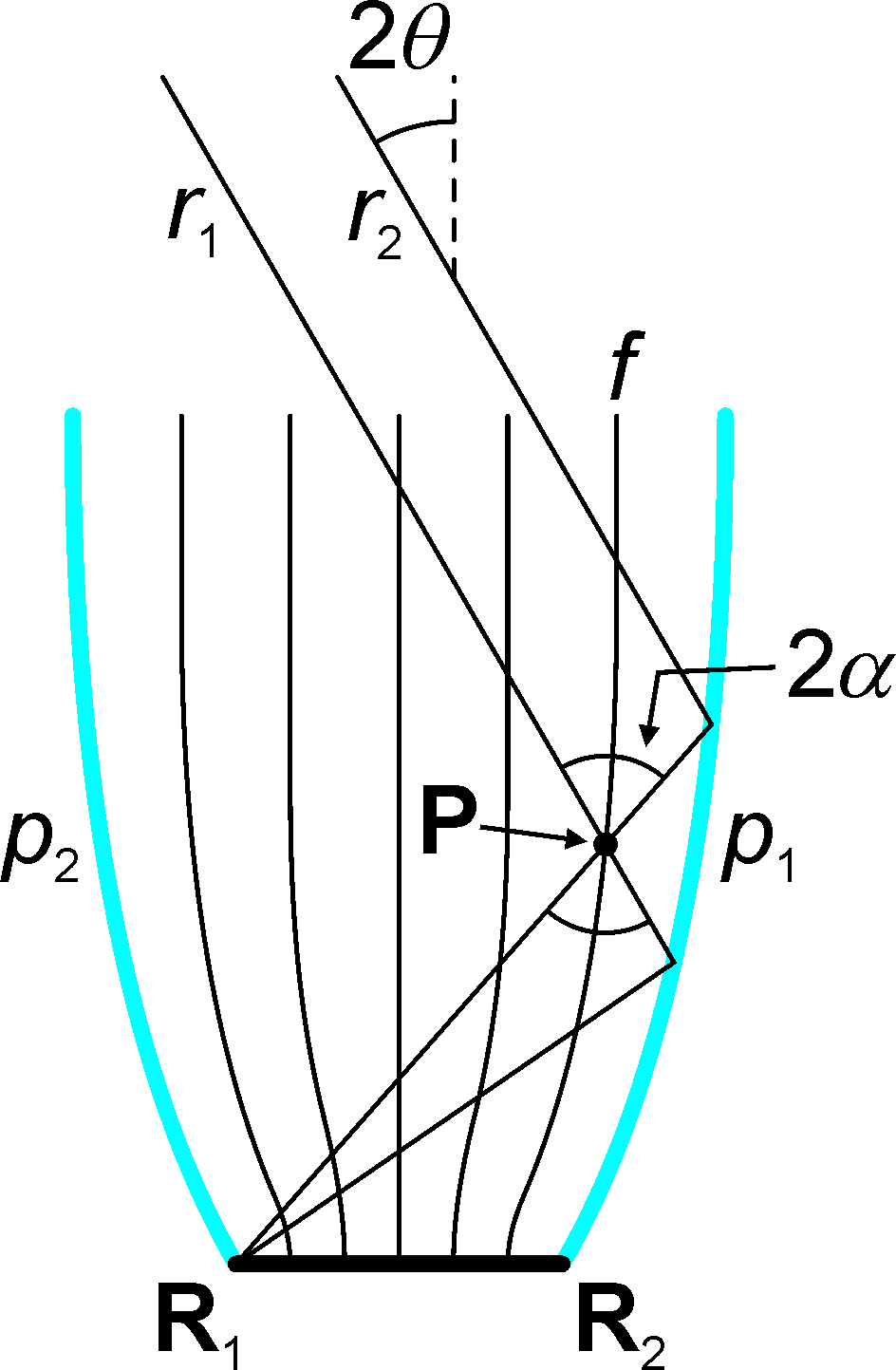
CPC flow-lines

The light crossing this point is confined to a cone of angular aperture 2α. A line f is also shown whose tangent at point P bisects this cone of light and, therefore, points in the direction of the "light flow" at P. Several other such lines are also shown in the figure. They all bisect the edge rays at each point inside the CPC and, for that reason, their tangent at each point points in the direction of the flow of light. These are called flow-lines and the CPC itself is just a combination of flow line p_{1} starting at R_{2} and p_{2} starting at R_{1}.

===== Variations to the flow-line design method =====
There are some variations to the flow-line design method.

A variation are the multichannel or stepped flow-line optics in which light is split into several "channels" and then recombined again into a single output. Aplanatic (a particular case of SMS) versions of these designs have also been developed. The main application of this method is in the design of ultra-compact optics.

Another variation is the confinement of light by caustics. Instead of light being confined by two reflective surfaces, it is confined by a reflective surface and a caustic of the edge rays. This provides the possibility to add lossless non-optical surfaces to the optics.

==== Simultaneous multiple surface (SMS) design method ====
This section describes

a nonimaging optics design method known in the field as the simultaneous multiple surface (SMS) or the Miñano-Benitez design method. The abbreviation SMS comes from the fact that it enables the simultaneous design of multiple optical surfaces. The original idea came from Miñano. The design method itself was initially developed in 2-D by Miñano and later also by Benítez. The first generalization to 3-D geometry came from Benítez. It was then much further developed by contributions of Miñano and Benítez. Other people have worked initially with Miñano and later with Miñano and Benítez on programming the method.

The design procedure

is related to the algorithm used by Schulz in the design of aspheric imaging lenses.

The SMS (or Miñano-Benitez) design method is very versatile and many different types of optics have been designed using it. The 2D version allows the design of two (although more are also possible) aspheric surfaces simultaneously. The 3D version allows the design of optics with freeform surfaces (also called anamorphic) surfaces which may not have any kind of symmetry.

SMS optics are also calculated by applying a constant optical path length between wavefronts. Figure "SMS chain" on the right illustrates how these optics are calculated. In general, the rays perpendicular to incoming wavefront w_{1} will be coupled to outgoing wavefront w_{4} and the rays perpendicular to incoming wavefront w_{2} will be coupled to outgoing wavefront w_{3} and these wavefronts may be any shape. However, for the sake of simplicity, this figure shows a particular case or circular wavefronts. This example shows a lens of a given refractive index n designed for a source S_{1}S_{2} and a receiver R_{1}R_{2}.

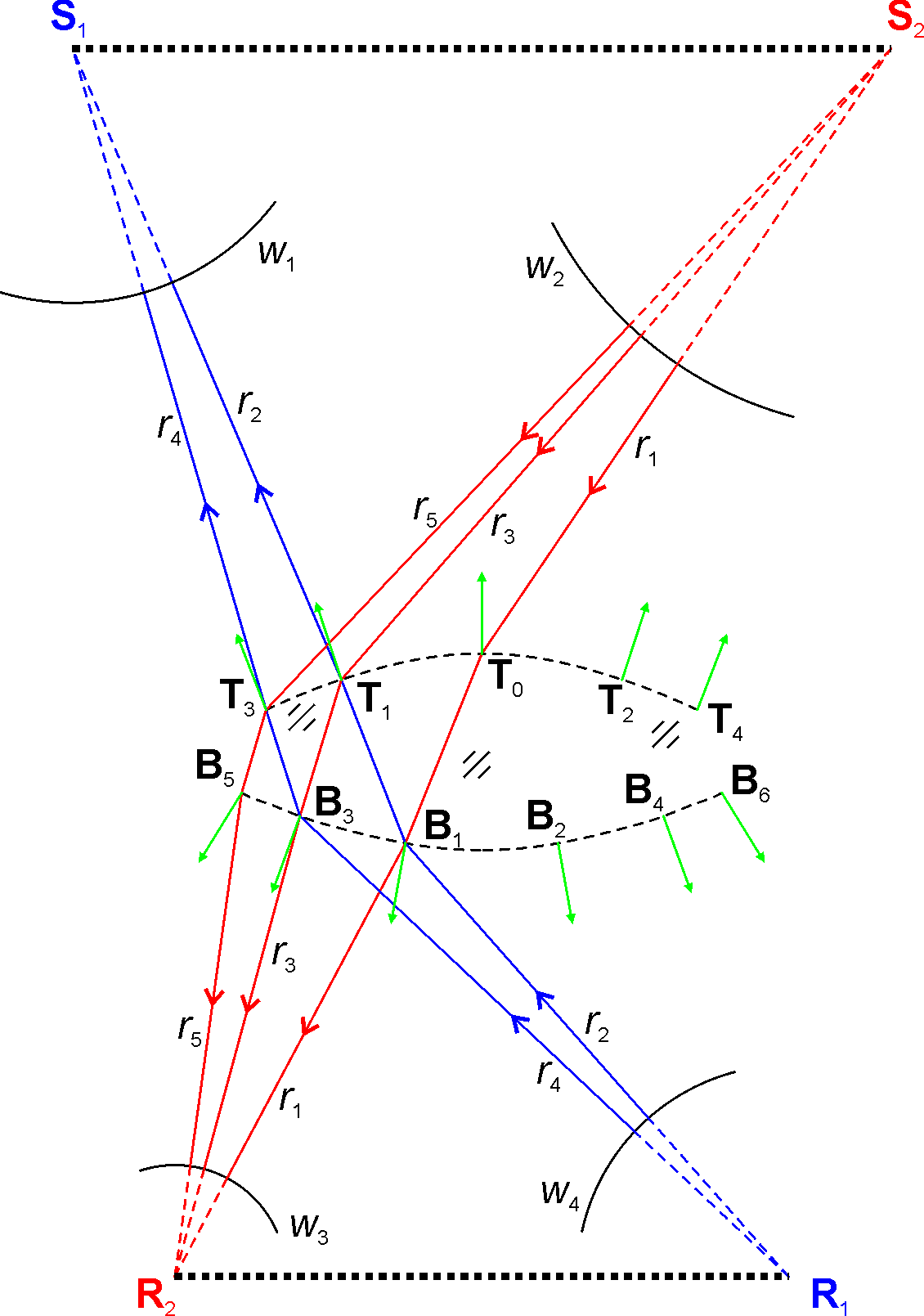
SMS chain

The rays emitted from edge S_{1} of the source are focused onto edge R_{1} of the receiver and those emitted from edge S_{2} of the source are focused onto edge R_{2} of the receiver. We first choose a point T_{0} and its normal on the top surface of the lens. We can now take a ray r_{1} coming from S_{2} and refract it at T_{0}. Choosing now the optical path length S_{22} between S_{2} and R_{2} we have one condition that allows us to calculate point B_{1} on the bottom surface of the lens. The normal at B_{1} can also be calculated from the directions of the incoming and outgoing rays at this point and the refractive index of the lens. Now we can repeat the process taking a ray r_{2} coming from R_{1} and refracting it at B_{1}. Choosing now the optical path length S_{11} between R_{1} and S_{1} we have one condition that allows us to calculate point T_{1} on the top surface of the lens. The normal at T_{1} can also be calculated from the directions of the incoming and outgoing rays at this point and the refractive index of the lens. Now, refracting at T_{1} a ray r_{3} coming from S_{2} we can calculate a new point B_{3} and corresponding normal on the bottom surface using the same optical path length S_{22} between S_{2} and R_{2}. Refracting at B_{3} a ray r_{4} coming from R_{1} we can calculate a new point T_{3} and corresponding normal on the top surface using the same optical path length S_{11} between R_{1} and S_{1}. The process continues by calculating another point B_{5} on the bottom surface using another edge ray r_{5}, and so on. The sequence of points T_{0} B_{1} T_{1} B_{3} T_{3} B_{5} is called an SMS chain.

Another SMS chain can be constructed towards the right starting at point T_{0}. A ray from S_{1} refracted at T_{0} defines a point and normal B_{2} on the bottom surface, by using constant optical path length S_{11} between S_{1} and R_{1}. Now a ray from R_{2} refracted at B_{2} defines a new point and normal T_{2} on the top surface, by using constant optical path length S_{22} between S_{2} and R_{2}. The process continues as more points are added to the SMS chain. In this example shown in the figure, the optic has a left-right symmetry and, therefore, points B_{2} T_{2} B_{4} T_{4} B_{6} can also be obtained by symmetry about the vertical axis of the lens.

Now we have a sequence of spaced points on the plane. Figure "SMS skinning" on the left illustrates the process used to fill the gaps between points, completely defining both optical surfaces.

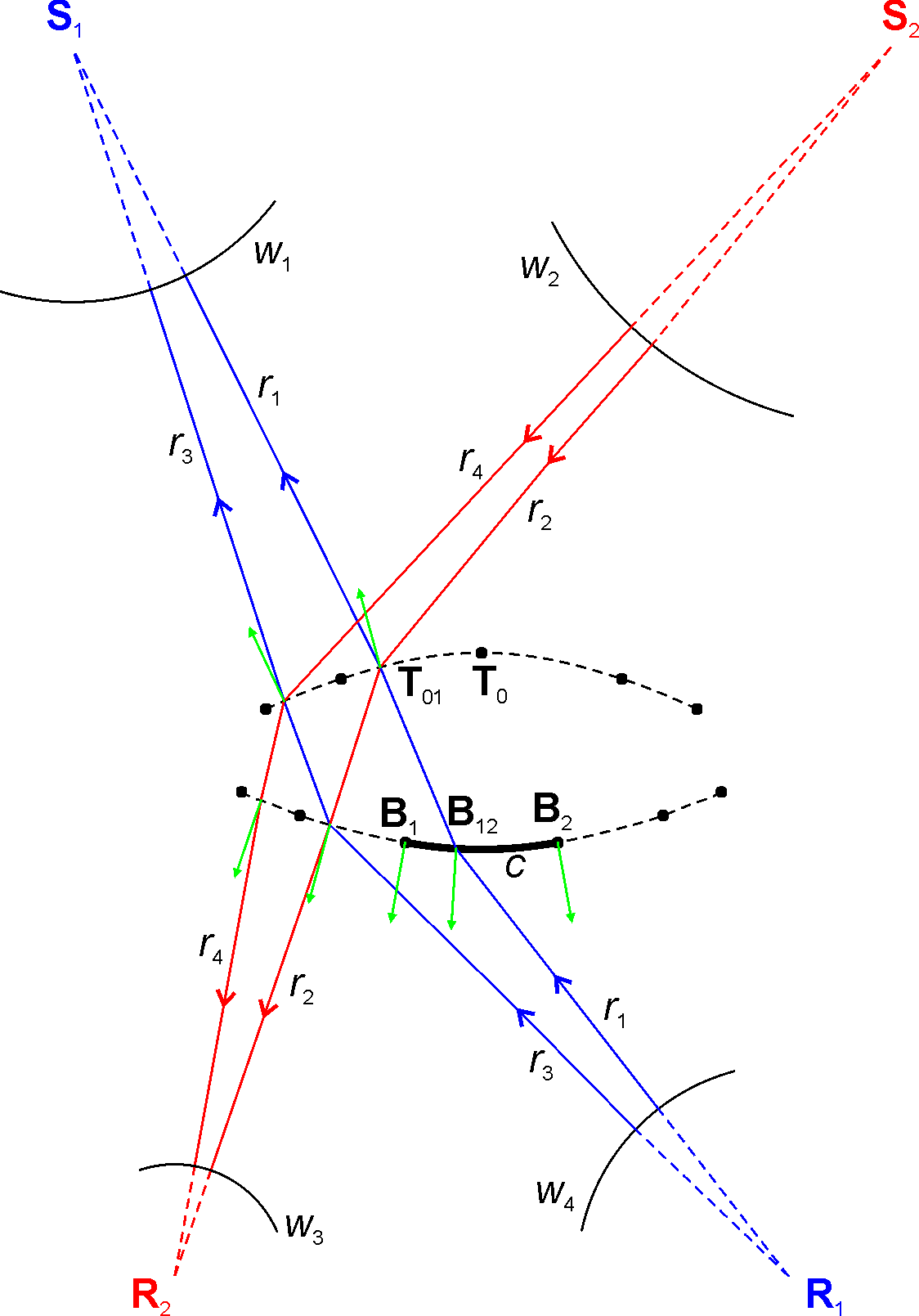
SMS skinning

We pick two points, say B_{1} and B_{2}, with their corresponding normals and interpolate a curve c between them. Now we pick a point B_{12} and its normal on c. A ray r_{1} coming from R_{1} and refracted at B_{12} defines a new point T_{01} and its normal between T_{0} and T_{1} on the top surface, by applying the same constant optical path length S_{11} between S_{1} and R_{1}. Now a ray r_{2} coming from S_{2} and refracted at T_{01} defines a new point and normal on the bottom surface, by applying the same constant optical path length S_{22} between S_{2} and R_{2}. The process continues with rays r_{3} and r_{4} building a new SMS chain filling the gaps between points. Picking other points and corresponding normals on curve c gives us more points in between the other SMS points calculated originally.

In general, the two SMS optical surfaces do not need to be refractive. Refractive surfaces are noted R (from Refraction) while reflective surfaces are noted X (from the Spanish word refleXión). Total Internal Reflection (TIR) is noted I. Therefore, a lens with two refractive surfaces is an RR optic, while another configuration with a reflective and a refractive surface is an XR optic. Configurations with more optical surfaces are also possible and, for example, if light is first refracted (R), then reflected (X) then reflected again by TIR (I), the optic is called an RXI.

The SMS 3D is similar to the SMS 2D, only now all calculations are done in 3D space. Figure "SMS 3D chain" on the right illustrates the algorithm of an SMS 3D calculation.

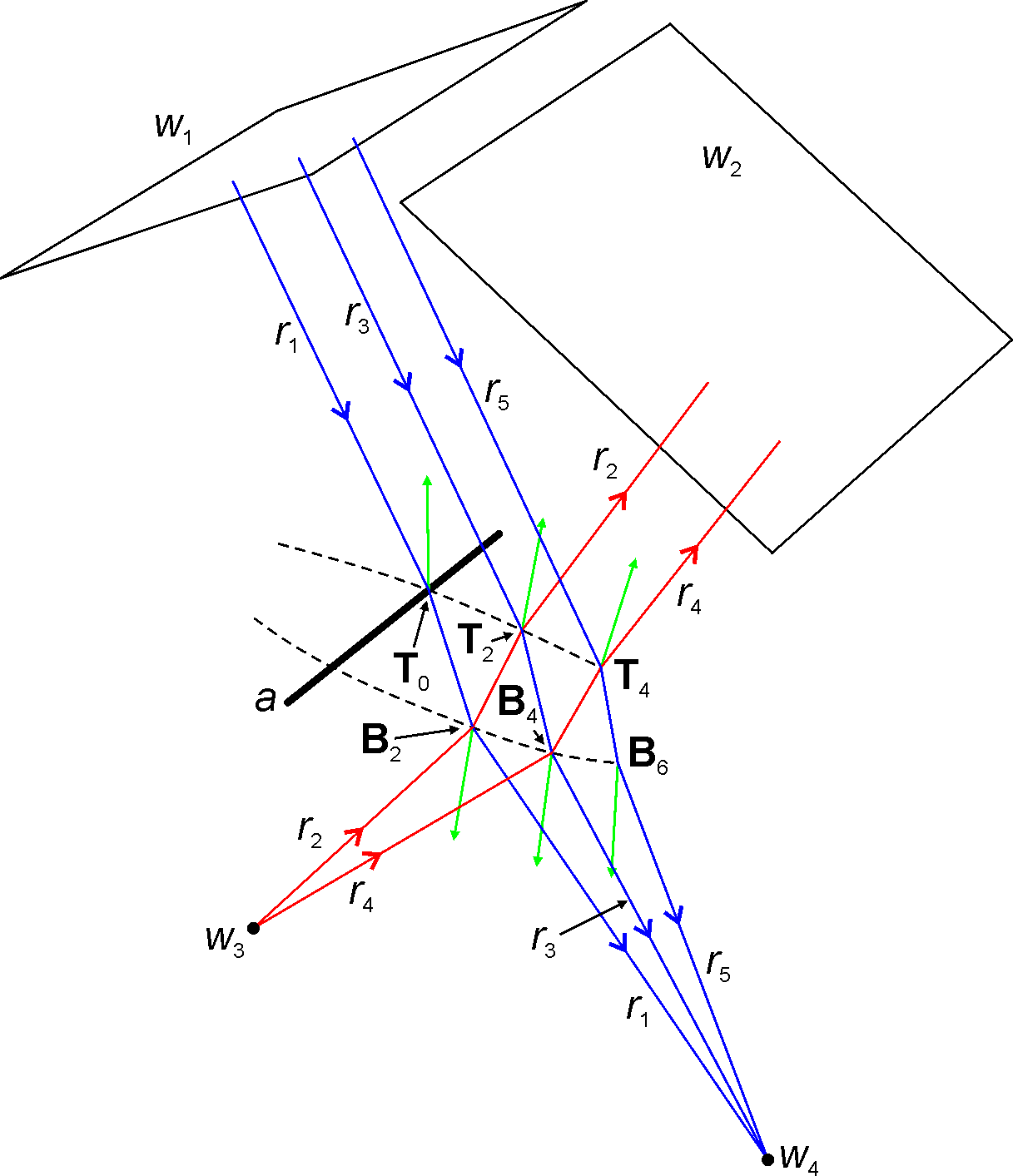
SMS 3D chain

The first step is to choose the incoming wavefronts w_{1} and w_{2} and outgoing wavefronts w_{3} and w_{4} and the optical path length S_{14} between w_{1} and w_{4} and the optical path length S_{23} between w_{2} and w_{3}. In this example the optic is a lens (an RR optic) with two refractive surfaces, so its refractive index must also be specified. One difference between the SMS 2D and the SMS 3D is on how to choose initial point T_{0}, which is now on a chosen 3D curve a. The normal chosen for point T_{0} must be perpendicular to curve a. The process now evolves similarly to the SMS 2D. A ray r_{1} coming from w_{1} is refracted at T_{0} and, with the optical path length S_{14}, a new point B_{2} and its normal is obtained on the bottom surface. Now ray r_{2} coming from w_{3} is refracted at B_{2} and, with the optical path length S _{23}, a new point T_{2} and its normal is obtained on the top surface. With ray r_{3} a new point B_{2} and its normal are obtained, with ray r_{4} a new point T_{4} and its normal are obtained, and so on. This process is performed in 3D space and the result is a 3D SMS chain. As with the SMS 2D, a set of points and normals to the left of T_{0} can also be obtained using the same method. Now, choosing another point T_{0} on curve a the process can be repeated and more points obtained on the top and bottom surfaces of the lens.

The power of the SMS method lies in the fact that the incoming and outgoing wavefronts can themselves be free-form, giving the method great flexibility. Also, by designing optics with reflective surfaces or combinations of reflective and refractive surfaces, different configurations are possible.

==== Miñano design method using Poisson brackets ====
This design method was developed by Miñano and is based on Hamiltonian optics, the Hamiltonian formulation of geometrical optics which shares much of the mathematical formulation with Hamiltonian mechanics. It allows the design of optics with variable refractive index, and therefore solves some nonimaging problems that are not solvable using other methods. However, manufacturing of variable refractive index optics is still not possible and this method, although potentially powerful, did not yet find a practical application.

=== Conservation of etendue ===
Conservation of etendue is a central concept in nonimaging optics. In concentration optics, it relates the acceptance angle with the maximum concentration possible. Conservation of etendue may be seen as constant a volume moving in phase space.

== Köhler integration ==
In some applications it is important to achieve a given irradiance (or illuminance) pattern on a target, while allowing for movements or inhomogeneities of the source. Figure "Köhler integrator" on the right illustrates this for the particular case of solar concentration. Here the light source is the sun moving in the sky. On the left this figure shows a lens L_{1} L_{2} capturing sunlight incident at an angle α to the optical axis and concentrating it onto a receiver L_{3} L_{4}. As seen, this light is concentrated onto a hotspot on the receiver. This may be a problem in some applications. One way around this is to add a new lens extending from L_{3} to L_{4} that captures the light from L_{1} L_{2} and redirects it onto a receiver R_{1} R_{2}, as shown in the middle of the figure.

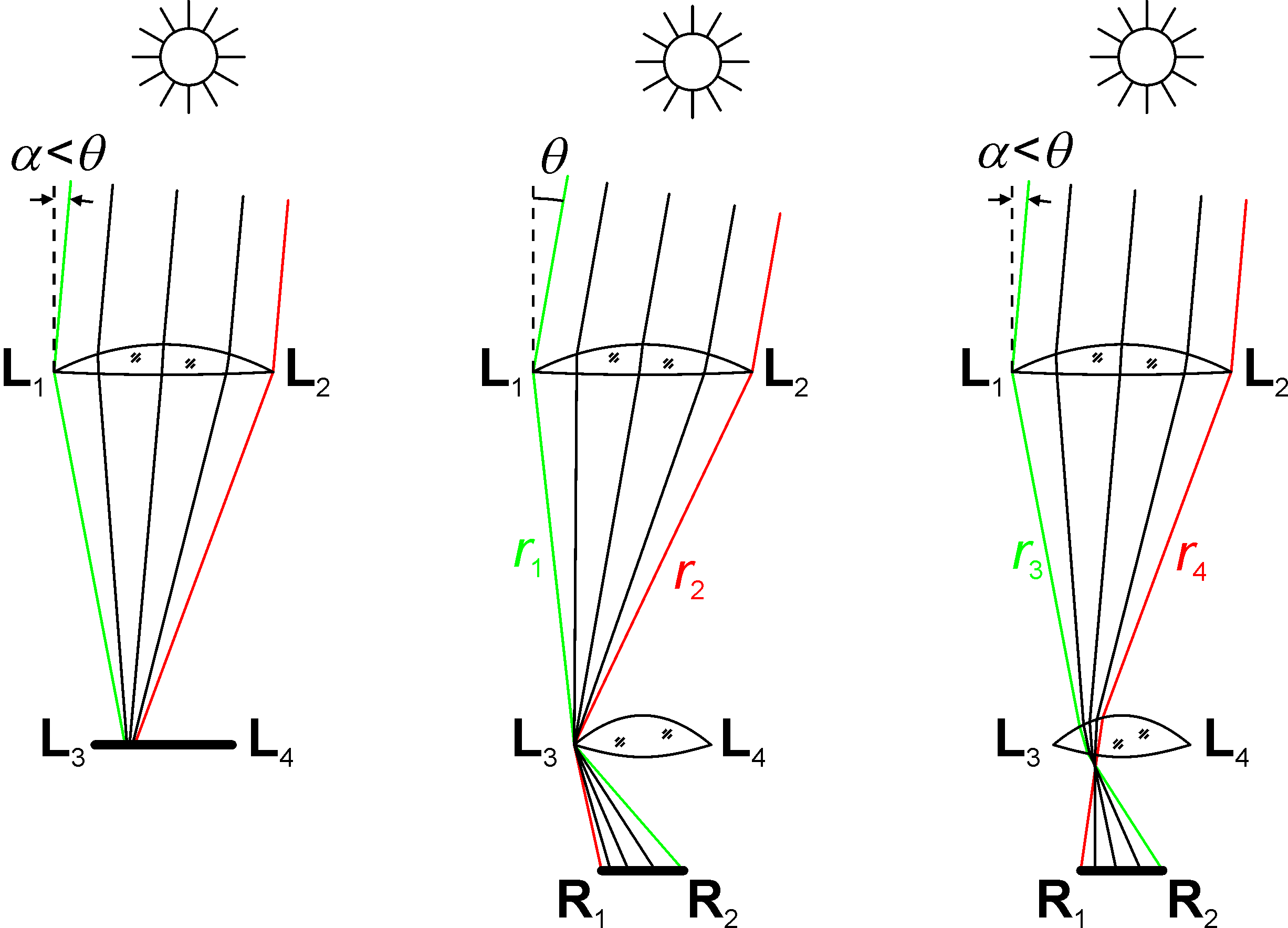
Köhler integrator

The situation in the middle of the figure shows a nonimaging lens L_{1} L_{2} is designed in such a way that sunlight (here considered as a set of parallel rays) incident at an angle θ to the optical axis will be concentrated to point L_{3}. On the other hand, nonimaging lens L_{3} L_{4} is designed in such a way that light rays coming from L_{1} are focused on R_{2} and light rays coming from L_{2} are focused on R_{1}. Therefore, ray r_{1} incident on the first lens at an angle θ will be redirected towards L_{3}. When it hits the second lens, it is coming from point L_{1} and it is redirected by the second lens to R_{2}. On the other hand, ray r_{2} also incident on the first lens at an angle θ will also be redirected towards L_{3}. However, when it hits the second lens, it is coming from point L_{2} and it is redirected by the second lens to R_{1}. Intermediate rays incident on the first lens at an angle θ will be redirected to points between R_{1} and R_{2}, fully illuminating the receiver.

Something similar happens in the situation shown in the same figure, on the right. Ray r_{3} incident on the first lens at an angle α<θ will be redirected towards a point between L_{3} and L_{4}. When it hits the second lens, it is coming from point L_{1} and it is redirected by the second lens to R_{2}. Also, Ray r_{4} incident on the first lens at an angle α<θ will be redirected towards a point between L_{3} and L_{4}. When it hits the second lens, it is coming from point L_{2} and it is redirected by the second lens to R_{1}. Intermediate rays incident on the first lens at an angle α<θ will be redirected to points between R_{1} and R_{2}, also fully illuminating the receiver.

This combination of optical elements is called Köhler illumination. Although the example given here was for solar energy concentration, the same principles apply for illumination in general. In practice, Köhler optics are typically not designed as a combination of nonimaging optics, but they are simplified versions with a lower number of active optical surfaces. This decreases the effectiveness of the method, but allows for simpler optics. Also, Köhler optics are often divided into several sectors, each one of them channeling light separately and then combining all the light on the target.

An example of one of these optics used for solar concentration is the Fresnel-R Köhler.

== Compound parabolic concentrator ==
In the drawing opposite there are two parabolic mirrors CC' (red) and DD' (blue). Both parabolas are cut at B and A respectively. A is the focal point of parabola CC' and B is the focal point of the parabola DD' The area DC is the entrance aperture and the flat absorber is AB. This CPC has an acceptance angle of θ.

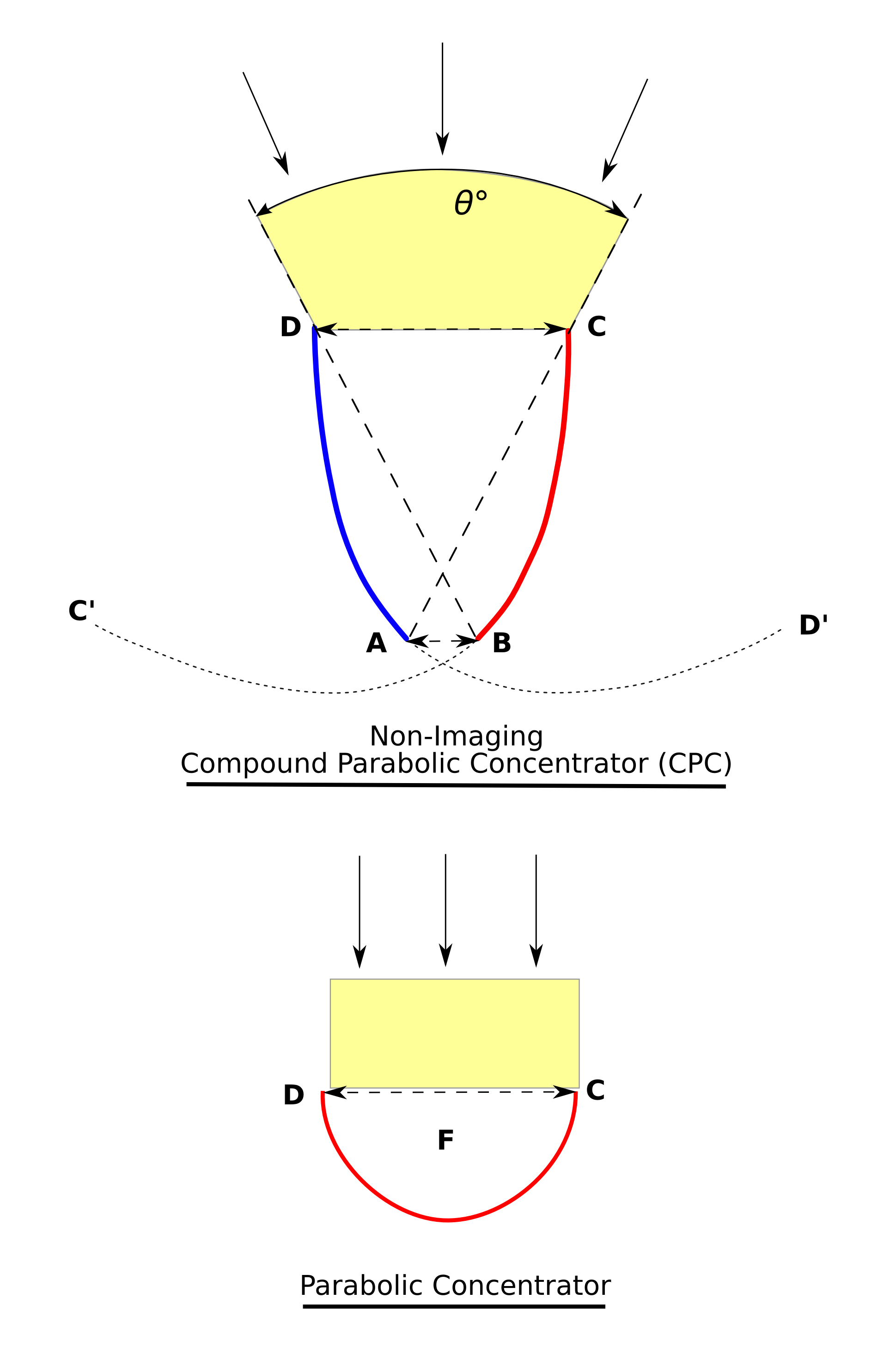
Comparison between non-imaging compound parabolic concentrator and parabolic concentrator

The parabolic concentrator has an entrance aperture of DC and a focal point F.

The parabolic concentrator only accepts rays of light that are perpendicular to the entrance aperture DC. The tracking of this type of concentrator must be more exact and requires expensive equipment.

The compound parabolic concentrator accepts a greater amount of light and needs less accurate tracking.

For a 3-dimensional "nonimaging compound parabolic concentrator", the maximum concentration possible in air or in vacuum (equal to the ratio of input and output aperture areas), is:

$$C = \frac{1}{\sin^2 \theta}\,,$$

where $\theta$ is the half-angle of the acceptance angle (of the larger aperture).

== History ==
The development started in the mid-1960s at three different locations by V. K. Baranov (USSR) with the study of the focons (focusing cones) Martin Ploke (Germany), and Roland Winston (United States), and led to the independent origin of the first nonimaging concentrators, later applied to solar energy concentration. Among these three earliest works, the one most developed was the American one, resulting in what nonimaging optics is today.

== See also ==
- Etendue
- Acceptance angle
- Concentrated photovoltaics
- Concentrated solar power
- Solid-state lighting
- Lighting
- Anidolic lighting
- Hamiltonian optics
- Winston cone
