= Roland Winston =

American scientist (1936–2025)

Roland Winston (February 12, 1936 – February 8, 2025) was an American scientist who was a leading figure in the field of nonimaging optics and its applications to solar energy, and is sometimes termed the "father of non-imaging optics". He was the inventor of the compound parabolic concentrator (CPC), a breakthrough technology in solar energy. He was also a former Guggenheim Fellow, past head of the University of Chicago Department of Physics, a member of the founding faculty of University of California Merced. He was nominated as head of the California Advanced Solar Technologies Institute in 2013.

Winston held more than 25 patents, chiefly related to solar energy, and has been figuratively said to have a "patent on the sun".

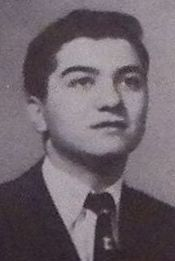
Roland Winston in 1952.

== Background ==
Roland Winston was born in Moscow, Russia to Claudia Goretskaya, a Russian chemical engineer and to Joseph Winston, an American engineer who helped Russians design towns and build an industrial base. At the beginning of World War II, after the signing of the Molotov-Ribbentrop Pact, Roland's father was expelled from the USSR, leaving his wife and son behind. In 1943, young Roland and his mother, that had been evacuated to Kuibyshev (now Samara), managed to leave the USSR with the help of American authorities and US Air Force long-range bombers.

In the USA, Winston first attended the Bronx High School of Science and then enrolled as an early entrant at Shimer College in 1950, transferring to the University of Chicago after two years. He received a BA from Shimer in 1953, in a graduating class of 11, including future cosmologist Jerome Kristian. Continuing with advanced undergraduate study at the University of Chicago, he received a BS in 1956.

Winston remained at University of Chicago for his graduate work in physics, completing his MS in 1957 and his Ph.D. in 1963. He studied under figures including Yoichiro Nambu and Subrahmanyan Chandrasekhar. Winston's doctoral dissertation was on "observable hyperfine effects in muon capture by complex nuclei."

Winston died on February 8, 2025, at the age of 88.

== Scientific career ==
Winston initially developed the underlying concept of the CPC for use in the study of Cherenkov radiation while working at Argonne National Laboratory in 1966. He was prompted to invent the CPC several years later in 1974, when Argonne director Robert Sachs asked him if it would be possible to extend the parabolic approach to solar energy applications, and if so, whether it would be superior to the existing systems that used imaging optics. Only a year after the invention of the CPC, it was discovered that this design had been anticipated by hundreds of millions of years by the eyes of the horseshoe crab. The paper announcing this discovery was also coauthored by Winston.

A key advantage of the CPC over the earlier imaging collectors was that it could achieve very high efficiencies without needing to track the sun. Non-tracking collectors had previously been believed to be impossible to design. In addition, CPCs received considerable media attention for their ability to function even under heavily clouded and hazy skies.

Winston and Joseph O'Gallagher devised a more refined version of the CPC in 1982, which was smaller and eliminated the need for an extra layer of glass.

In 1988, using a new mirror-based technique, Winston and his team set a new record for concentration of solar energy, concentrating sunlight to more than 60,000 times its normal intensity. In 1989, Winston coauthored with W.T. Welford what became the defining text of the field, High Collection Nonimaging Optics. Later revised under the name of Nonimaging Optics, it remains a classic in the field.

From 1989 to 1995, he served as chair of the Department of Physics of the University of Chicago. In addition to his solar energy work, he has continued to work in his original field of high-energy physics, conducting experiments at Argonne and Fermilab.

In 2003, Winston left the University of Chicago, where he had been working and studying since 1952, to join the founding faculty of the University of California Merced. He has however remained connected the U of C and the city of Chicago, and has remained affiliated with the university's Enrico Fermi Institute. In 2004 he partnered with Chicago company Solargenix Energy to create roof-integrated solar cooling and heating systems.

On June 13, 2022, Winston announced he would retire on July 1. Of the first eight founding faculty members, he was the first one to leave after nearly two decades of service to the UC Merced and the University of California system.

== Awards and recognition ==
Winston has received numerous awards in the course of his career, including a Guggenheim Fellowship in 1977 and the Joseph Fraunhofer Award for "significant accomplishments in optical engineering" from the Optical Society of America in 2009. He was elected as a US delegate to the International Solar Energy Society in 1991. Also in 1991, he was elected a Fellow of OSA.

Devices to which Winston's name has become attached include the CPC itself, which is sometimes known as a "Winston solar collector", and "Winston cones", the individual parabolic elements that make up a CPC.

== Writings ==
- Garcia-Botella, Angel; Winston, Roland; Jiang, Lun (2023). Field Theory of Nonimaging Optics. CRC Press. ISBN 978-1-000873-19-1.
- Winston, Roland; Juan C., Miñano; Pablo, Benitez (2005). Nonimaging Optics. Academic Press. ISBN 978-0-12-759751-5.
- Welford, W. T.; Roland, Winston (1989). High Collection Nonimaging Optics. Academic Press. ISBN 978-0-323-15723-0.

== Works cited ==
- Gilmore, C.P. (October 1976). "Concentrating collectors for solar heating and cooling". Popular Science. pp. 96ff.
- O'Gallagher, Joseph (2008). Nonimaging optics in solar energy. Morgan & Claypool Publishers. ISBN 978-1-59829-330-2.
- Shrum, Wesley Jr.; Joel Genuth; Ivan Chompalov (2007). Structures of scientific collaboration. MIT Press. ISBN 978-0-262-19559-1.
