= Hamiltonian optics =

Formulation of geometrical optics

Hamiltonian optics and Lagrangian optics are two formulations of geometrical optics which share much of the mathematical formalism with Hamiltonian mechanics and Lagrangian mechanics.

== Hamilton's principle ==
In physics, Hamilton's principle states that the evolution of a system $\left(q_1{\left(\sigma\right)},\dots,q_N{\left(\sigma\right)}\right)$ described by $N$ generalized coordinates between two specified states at two specified parameters σ_{A} and σ_{B} is a stationary point (a point where the variation is zero) of the action functional, or
$$\delta S= \delta\int_{\sigma_{A}}^{\sigma_{B}} L\left(q_1,\cdots,q_N,\dot{q}_1,\cdots,\dot{q}_N,\sigma\right)\, d\sigma=0$$
where $\dot{q}_k=dq_k/d\sigma$ and $L$ is the Lagrangian. Condition $\delta S=0$ is valid if and only if the Euler–Lagrange equations are satisfied, i.e.,
$$\frac{\partial L}{\partial q_k} -
\frac{d}{d\sigma}\frac{\partial L}{\partial \dot q_k} = 0$$
with $k = 1, \dots, N$.

The momentum is defined as
$$p_k=\frac{\partial L}{\partial \dot q_k}$$
and the Euler–Lagrange equations can then be rewritten as
$$\dot p_k = \frac{\partial L}{\partial q_k}$$
where $\dot{p}_k = dp_k/d\sigma$.

A different approach to solving this problem consists in defining a Hamiltonian (taking a Legendre transform of the Lagrangian) as
$$H = \sum_k {\dot q_k} p_k - L$$
for which a new set of differential equations can be derived by looking at how the total differential of the Lagrangian depends on parameter σ, positions $q_i$ and their derivatives $\dot q_i$ relative to σ. This derivation is the same as in Hamiltonian mechanics, only with time t now replaced by a general parameter σ. Those differential equations are the Hamilton's equations
$$\frac{\partial H}{\partial q_k} =- \dot{p}_k \,, \quad \frac{\partial H}{\partial p_k} = \dot{q}_k \,, \quad \frac{dH}{d\sigma} = - {\partial L \over \partial \sigma} \,.$$
with $k = 1, \dots, N$. Hamilton's equations are first-order differential equations, while the Euler–Lagrange equations are second-order.

== Lagrangian optics ==
The general results presented above for Hamilton's principle can be applied to optics. In 3D euclidean space the generalized coordinates are now the coordinates of euclidean space.

=== Fermat's principle ===
Fermat's principle states that the optical length of the path followed by light between two fixed points, A and B, is a stationary point. It may be a maximum, a minimum, constant or an inflection point. In general, as light travels, it moves in a medium of variable refractive index which is a scalar field of position in space, that is, $n = n\left(x_1,x_2,x_3\right)$ in 3D euclidean space. Assuming now that light travels along the x_{3} axis, the path of a light ray may be parametrized as $s=\left(x_1\left(x_3\right),x_2\left(x_3\right),x_3\right)$ starting at a point $\mathbf{A}=\left(x_1\left(x_{3A}\right),x_2\left(x_{3A}\right),x_{3A}\right)$ and ending at a point $\mathbf{B}=\left(x_1\left(x_{3B}\right),x_2\left(x_{3B}\right),x_{3B}\right)$. In this case, when compared to Hamilton's principle above, coordinates $x_1$ and $x_2$ take the role of the generalized coordinates $q_k$ while $x_3$ takes the role of parameter $\sigma$, that is, parameter σ =x_{3} and N=2.

In the context of calculus of variations this can be written as
$$\delta S= \delta\int_{\mathbf{A}}^{\mathbf{B}} n \, ds = \delta\int_{x_{3A}}^{x_{3B}} n \frac{ds}{dx_3}\, dx_3 = \delta\int_{x_{3A}}^{x_{3B}} L\left(x_1,x_2,\dot{x}_1,\dot{x}_2,x_3\right)\, dx_3=0$$
where ds is an infinitesimal displacement along the ray given by $ds = \sqrt{dx_1^2 + dx_2^2 + dx_3^2}$ and
$$L = n\frac{ds}{dx_3} = n\left(x_1,x_2,x_3\right) \sqrt{1+\dot{x}_1^2+\dot{x}_2^2}$$
is the optical Lagrangian and $\dot{x}_k = dx_k/dx_3$.

The optical path length (OPL) is defined as
$$S = \int_{\mathbf{A}}^{\mathbf{B}} n \, ds= \int_{\mathbf{A}}^{\mathbf{B}} L \, dx_3$$
where n is the local refractive index as a function of position along the path between points A and B.

=== The Euler–Lagrange equations ===
The general results presented above for Hamilton's principle can be applied to optics using the Lagrangian defined in Fermat's principle. The Euler–Lagrange equations with parameter σ =x_{3} and N=2 applied to Fermat's principle result in
$$\frac{\partial L}{\partial x_k} -
\frac{d}{dx_3}\frac{\partial L}{\partial \dot x_k} = 0$$
with k = 1, 2 and where L is the optical Lagrangian and $\dot{x}_k=dx_k/dx_3$.

=== Optical momentum ===
The optical momentum is defined as
$$p_k = \frac{\partial L}{\partial \dot x_k}$$
and from the definition of the optical Lagrangian $L = n\sqrt{1+\dot{x}_1^2+\dot{x}_2^2}$ this expression can be rewritten as
$$p_k=n\frac{\dot{x}_k}{\sqrt{\dot{x}_1^2+\dot{x}_2^2+\dot{x}_3^2}}
=n\frac{dx_k}{\sqrt{dx_1^2+dx_2^2+dx_3^2}}
=n\frac{dx_k}{ds}$$

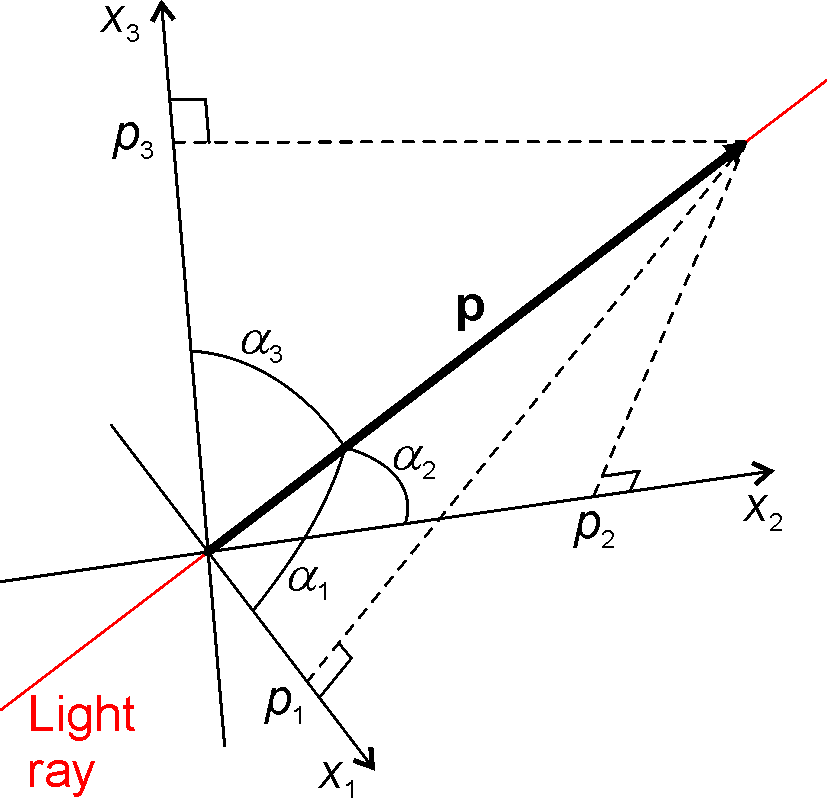
Optical momentum

or in vector form
$$\mathbf{p}  = n\frac{\mathbf{ds}}{ds}=\left(p_1,p_2,p_3\right)
= \left(n \cos \alpha_1,n \cos \alpha_2,n \cos \alpha_3\right)=n\mathbf{\hat{e}}$$
where $\mathbf{\hat{e}}$ is a unit vector and angles α_{1}, α_{2} and α_{3} are the angles p makes to axis x_{1}, x_{2} and x_{3} respectively, as shown in figure "optical momentum". Therefore, the optical momentum is a vector of norm
$$\|\mathbf{p}\| = \sqrt{p_1^2+p_2^2+p_3^2} = n$$
where n is the refractive index at which p is calculated. Vector p points in the direction of propagation of light. If light is propagating in a gradient index optic the path of the light ray is curved and vector p is tangent to the light ray.

The expression for the optical path length can also be written as a function of the optical momentum. Having in consideration that $\dot{x}_3=dx_3/dx_3=1$ the expression for the optical Lagrangian can be rewritten as
$$\begin{align}
L &= n\sqrt{\dot{x}_1^2+\dot{x}_2^2+\dot{x}_3^2}
= \dot{x}_1\frac{n \dot{x}_1}{\sqrt{\dot{x}_1^2+\dot{x}_2^2+\dot{x}_3^2}}+\dot{x}_2\frac{n \dot{x}_2}{\sqrt{\dot{x}_1^2+\dot{x}_2^2+\dot{x}_3^2}}+\frac{n \dot{x}_3}{\sqrt{\dot{x}_1^2+\dot{x}_2^2+\dot{x}_3^2}} \\[1ex]
&= \dot{x}_1 p_1+\dot{x}_2 p_2+\dot{x}_3 p_3=\dot{x}_1 p_1+\dot{x}_2 p_2+p_3
\end{align}$$
and the expression for the optical path length is
$$S= \int L \, dx_3= \int \mathbf{p} \cdot d\mathbf{s}$$

=== Hamilton's equations ===
Similarly to what happens in Hamiltonian mechanics, also in optics the Hamiltonian is defined by the expression given above for N = 2 corresponding to functions $x_1{\left(x_3\right)}$ and $x_2{\left(x_3\right)}$ to be determined
$$H = \dot{x}_1 p_1+\dot{x}_2 p_2 - L$$

Comparing this expression with $L=\dot{x}_1 p_1+\dot{x}_2 p_2+p_3$ for the Lagrangian results in
$$H =-p_3=-\sqrt{n^2-p_1^2-p_2^2}$$

And the corresponding Hamilton's equations with parameter σ =x_{3} and k=1,2 applied to optics are
$$\frac{\partial H}{\partial x_k} =- \dot{p}_k \,, \quad \frac{\partial H}{\partial p_k} = \dot{x}_k$$
with $\dot{x}_k=dx_k/dx_3$ and $\dot{p}_k = dp_k/dx_3$.

== Applications ==
It is assumed that light travels along the x_{3} axis, in Hamilton's principle above, coordinates $x_1$ and $x_2$ take the role of the generalized coordinates $q_k$ while $x_3$ takes the role of parameter $\sigma$, that is, parameter σ =x_{3} and N=2.

=== Refraction and reflection ===
If plane x_{1}x_{2} separates two media of refractive index n_{A} below and n_{B} above it, the refractive index is given by a step function
$$n(x_3) = \begin{cases}
n_A & \text{if } x_3<0 \\
n_B & \text{if } x_3>0 \\
\end{cases}$$
and from Hamilton's equations
$$\frac{\partial H}{\partial x_k} =-\frac{\partial }{\partial x_k} \sqrt{n(x_3)^2-p_1^2-p_2^2}=0$$
and therefore $\dot{p}_k=0$ or $p_k=\text{Constant}$ for k = 1, 2.

An incoming light ray has momentum p_{A} before refraction (below plane x_{1}x_{2}) and momentum p_{B} after refraction (above plane x_{1}x_{2}). The light ray makes an angle θ_{A} with axis x_{3} (the normal to the refractive surface) before refraction and an angle θ_{B} with axis x_{3} after refraction. Since the p_{1} and p_{2} components of the momentum are constant, only p_{3} changes from p_{3A} to p_{3B}.

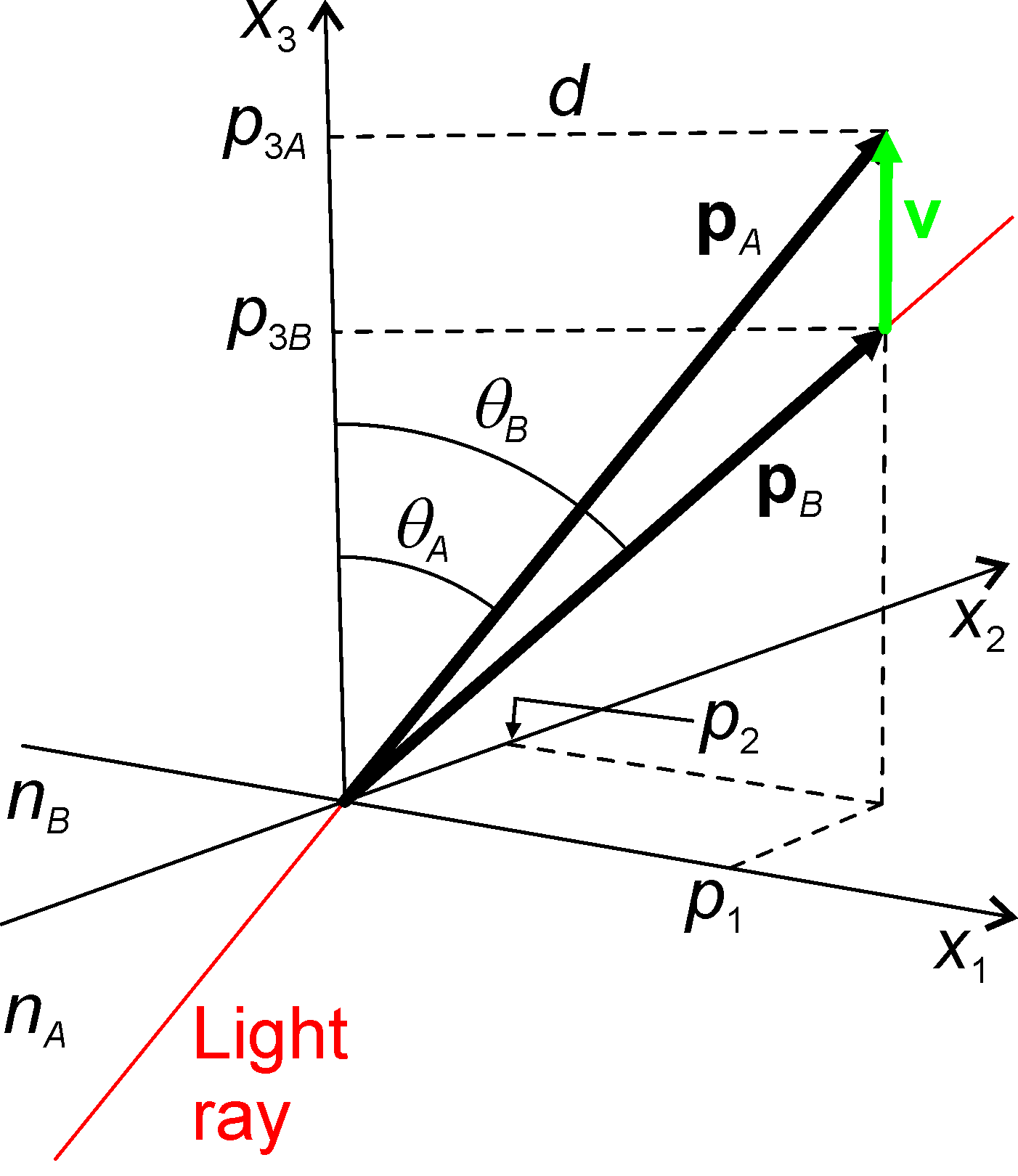
Refraction

Figure "refraction" shows the geometry of this refraction from which $d=\|\mathbf{p}_A\|\sin\theta_A=\|\mathbf{p}_B\|\sin\theta_B$. Since $\|\mathbf{p}_A\|=n_A$ and $\|\mathbf{p}_B\|=n_B$, this last expression can be written as
$$n_A \sin\theta_A = n_B \sin\theta_B$$
which is Snell's law of refraction.

In figure "refraction", the normal to the refractive surface points in the direction of axis x_{3}, and also of vector $\mathbf{v} = \mathbf{p}_A - \mathbf{p}_B$. A unit normal $\mathbf{n} = \mathbf{v} / \|\mathbf{v}\|$ to the refractive surface can then be obtained from the momenta of the incoming and outgoing rays by
$$\mathbf{n} = \frac{\mathbf{p}_A-\mathbf{p}_B}{\|\mathbf{p}_A-\mathbf{p}_B\|} = \frac{n_A \mathbf{i}-n_B\mathbf{r}}{\|n_A\mathbf{i}-n_B\mathbf{r}\|}$$
where i and r are unit vectors in the directions of the incident and refracted rays. Also, the outgoing ray (in the direction of $\mathbf{p}_B$) is contained in the plane defined by the incoming ray (in the direction of $\mathbf{p}_A$) and the normal $\mathbf{n}$ to the surface.

A similar argument can be used for reflection in deriving the law of specular reflection, only now with n_{A}=n_{B}, resulting in θ_{A}=θ_{B}. Also, if i and r are unit vectors in the directions of the incident and refracted ray respectively, the corresponding normal to the surface is given by the same expression as for refraction, only with n_{A}=n_{B}
$$\mathbf{n} = \frac{\mathbf{i}-\mathbf{r}}{\|\mathbf{i}-\mathbf{r}\|}$$

In vector form, if i is a unit vector pointing in the direction of the incident ray and n is the unit normal to the surface, the direction r of the refracted ray is given by:
$$\mathbf{r} = \frac{n_A}{n_B} \mathbf{i} + \left (- \left (\mathbf{i} \cdot \mathbf{n} \right ) \frac{n_A}{n_B}  + \sqrt{\Delta} \right ) \mathbf{n}$$
with
$$\Delta = 1- \left (\frac{n_A}{n_B} \right)^2 \left (1- \left (\mathbf{i} \cdot \mathbf{n} \right )^2\right)$$

If i⋅n<0 then −n should be used in the calculations. When $\Delta < 0$, light suffers total internal reflection and the expression for the reflected ray is that of reflection:
$$\mathbf{r} = \mathbf{i} -2 \left ( \mathbf{i} \cdot \mathbf{n} \right) \mathbf{n}$$

=== Rays and wavefronts ===
From the definition of optical path length $S = \int L\, dx_3$
$$\frac{\partial S}{\partial x_k}= \int \frac{\partial L}{\partial x_k} \, dx_3 = \int \frac{dp_k}{dx_3} \, dx_3 = p_k$$

Rays and wavefronts

with k=1,2 where the Euler–Lagrange equations $\partial L/\partial x_k = dp_k/dx_3$ with k=1,2 were used. Also, from the last of Hamilton's equations $dH/dx_3=-\partial L/\partial x_3$ and from $H=-p_3$ above
$$\frac{\partial S}{\partial x_3}= \int \frac{\partial L}{\partial x_3} \, dx_3 = \int \frac{dp_3}{dx_3} \, dx_3=p_3$$
combining the equations for the components of momentum p results in
$$\mathbf{p}=\nabla S$$

Since p is a vector tangent to the light rays, surfaces S=Constant must be perpendicular to those light rays. These surfaces are called wavefronts. Figure "rays and wavefronts" illustrates this relationship. Also shown is optical momentum p, tangent to a light ray and perpendicular to the wavefront.

Vector field $\mathbf{p}=\nabla S$ is conservative vector field. The gradient theorem can then be applied to the optical path length (as given above) resulting in
$$S= \int_{\mathbf{A}}^{\mathbf{B}} \mathbf{p} \cdot d\mathbf{s} = \int_{\mathbf{A}}^{\mathbf{B}} \nabla S \cdot d\mathbf{s} = S(\mathbf{B})-S(\mathbf{A})$$
and the optical path length S calculated along a curve C between points A and B is a function of only its end points A and B and not the shape of the curve between them. In particular, if the curve is closed, it starts and ends at the same point, or A=B so that
$$S= \oint \nabla S \cdot d\mathbf{s}=0$$

This result may be applied to a closed path ABCDA as in figure "optical path length"
$$S= \int_{\mathbf{A}}^{\mathbf{B}} \mathbf{p} \cdot d\mathbf{s}
+\int_{\mathbf{B}}^{\mathbf{C}} \mathbf{p} \cdot d\mathbf{s}
+\int_{\mathbf{C}}^{\mathbf{D}} \mathbf{p} \cdot d\mathbf{s}
+\int_{\mathbf{D}}^{\mathbf{A}} \mathbf{p} \cdot d\mathbf{s}=0$$

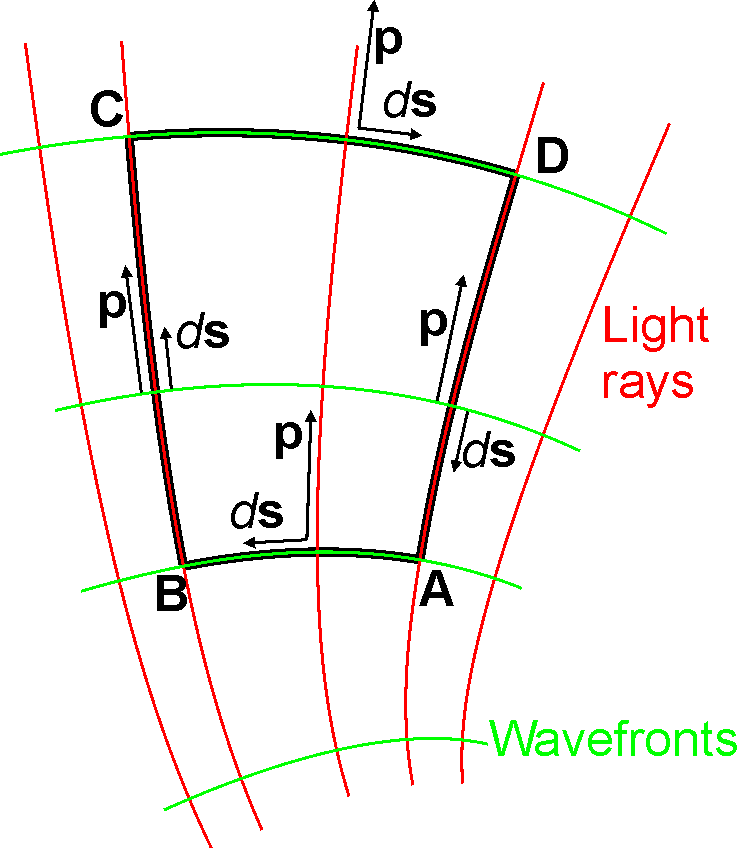
Optical path length

for curve segment AB the optical momentum p is perpendicular to a displacement ds along curve AB, or $\mathbf{p} \cdot d \mathbf{s}=0$. The same is true for segment CD. For segment BC the optical momentum p has the same direction as displacement ds and $\mathbf{p} \cdot d \mathbf{s}=nds$. For segment DA the optical momentum p has the opposite direction to displacement ds and $\mathbf{p} \cdot d \mathbf{s}=-n\,ds$. However inverting the direction of the integration so that the integral is taken from A to D, ds inverts direction and $\mathbf{p} \cdot d \mathbf{s}=n\,ds$. From these considerations
$$\int_{\mathbf{B}}^{\mathbf{C}} n\,ds=\int_{\mathbf{A}}^{\mathbf{D}} n\,ds$$
or
$$S_\mathbf{BC}=S_\mathbf{AD}$$
and the optical path length S_{BC} between points B and C along the ray connecting them is the same as the optical path length S_{AD} between points A and D along the ray connecting them. The optical path length is constant between wavefronts.

=== Phase space ===
Figure "2D phase space" shows at the top some light rays in a two-dimensional space. Here x_{2}=0 and p_{2}=0 so light travels on the plane x_{1}x_{3} in directions of increasing x_{3} values. In this case $p_1^2+p_3^2=n^2$ and the direction of a light ray is completely specified by the p_{1} component of momentum $\mathbf{p}=(p_1,p_3)$ since p_{2}=0. If p_{1} is given, p_{3} may be calculated (given the value of the refractive index n) and therefore p_{1} suffices to determine the direction of the light ray. The refractive index of the medium the ray is traveling in is determined by $\|\mathbf{p}\|=n$.

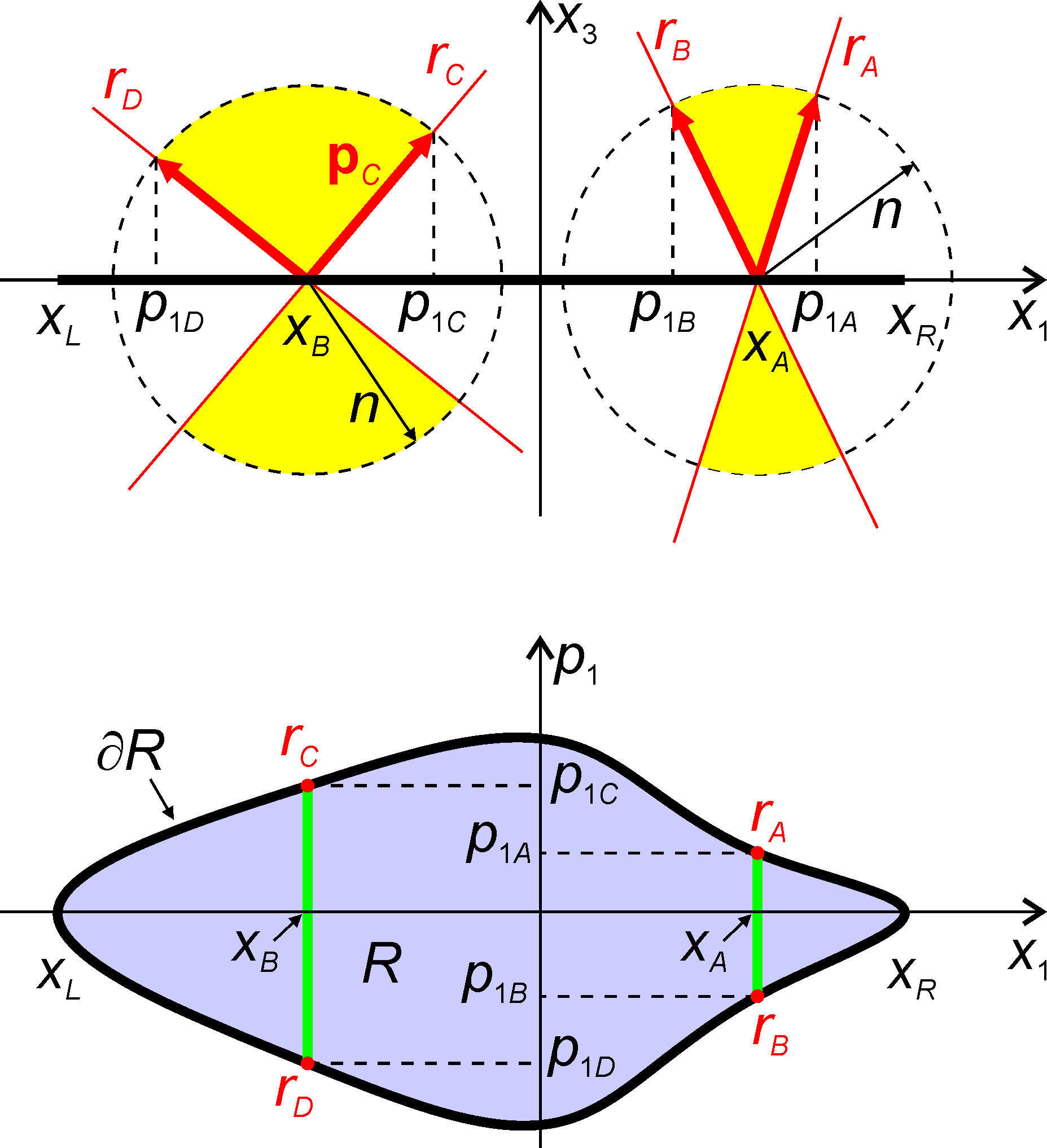
2D phase space

For example, ray r_{C} crosses axis x_{1} at coordinate x_{B} with an optical momentum p_{C}, which has its tip on a circle of radius n centered at position x_{B}. Coordinate x_{B} and the horizontal coordinate p_{1C} of momentum p_{C} completely define ray r_{C} as it crosses axis x_{1}. This ray may then be defined by a point r_{C}=(x_{B},p_{1C}) in space x_{1}p_{1} as shown at the bottom of the figure. Space x_{1}p_{1} is called phase space and different light rays may be represented by different points in this space.

As such, ray r_{D} shown at the top is represented by a point r_{D} in phase space at the bottom. All rays crossing axis x_{1} at coordinate x_{B} contained between rays r_{C} and r_{D} are represented by a vertical line connecting points r_{C} and r_{D} in phase space. Accordingly, all rays crossing axis x_{1} at coordinate x_{A} contained between rays r_{A} and r_{B} are represented by a vertical line connecting points r_{A} and r_{B} in phase space. In general, all rays crossing axis x_{1} between x_{L} and x_{R} are represented by a volume R in phase space. The rays at the boundary ∂R of volume R are called edge rays. For example, at position x_{A} of axis x_{1}, rays r_{A} and r_{B} are the edge rays since all other rays are contained between these two. (A ray parallel to x1 would not be between the two rays, since the momentum is not in-between the two rays)

In three-dimensional geometry the optical momentum is given by $\mathbf{p}=(p_1,p_2,p_3)$ with $p_1^2+p_2^2+p_3^2=n^2$. If p_{1} and p_{2} are given, p_{3} may be calculated (given the value of the refractive index n) and therefore p_{1} and p_{2} suffice to determine the direction of the light ray. A ray traveling along axis x_{3} is then defined by a point (x_{1},x_{2}) in plane x_{1}x_{2} and a direction (p_{1},p_{2}). It may then be defined by a point in four-dimensional phase space x_{1}x_{2}p_{1}p_{2}.

=== Conservation of etendue ===
Figure "volume variation" shows a volume V bound by an area A. Over time, if the boundary A moves, the volume of V may vary. In particular, an infinitesimal area dA with outward pointing unit normal n moves with a velocity v.

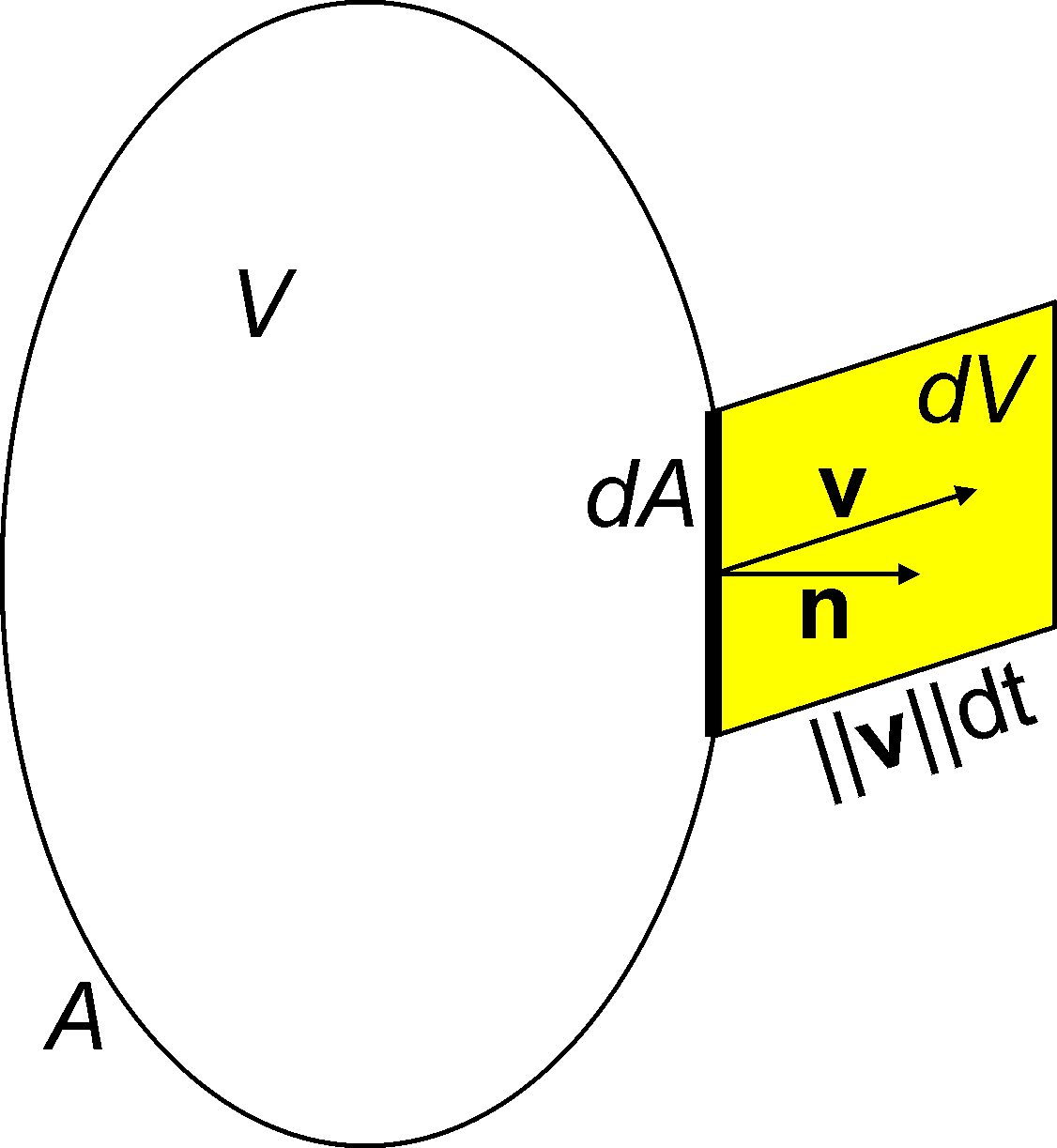
Volume variation

This leads to a volume variation $dV = dA(\mathbf{v} \cdot \mathbf{n}) dt$. Making use of Gauss's theorem, the variation in time of the total volume V volume moving in space is
$$\frac{dV}{dt}=\int_A \mathbf{v}\cdot\mathbf{n}\,dA=\int_V \nabla \cdot \mathbf{v}\,dV$$

The rightmost term is a volume integral over the volume V and the middle term is the surface integral over the boundary A of the volume V. Also, v is the velocity with which the points in V are moving.

In optics coordinate $x_3$ takes the role of time. In phase space a light ray is identified by a point $(x_1, x_2, p_1, p_2)$ which moves with a "velocity" $\mathbf{v}=(\dot{x}_1, \dot{x}_2, \dot{p}_1, \dot{p}_2)$ where the dot represents a derivative relative to $x_3$. A set of light rays spreading over $dx_1$ in coordinate $x_1$, $dx_2$ in coordinate $x_2$, $dp_1$ in coordinate $p_1$ and $dp_2$ in coordinate $p_2$ occupies a volume $dV=dx_1dx_2dp_1dp_2$ in phase space. In general, a large set of rays occupies a large volume $V$ in phase space to which Gauss's theorem may be applied
$$\frac{dV}{dx_3}=\int_V \nabla \cdot \mathbf{v}\,dV$$
and using Hamilton's equations
$$\nabla \cdot \mathbf{v}=
\frac{\partial \dot{x}_1}{\partial x_1}
+\frac{\partial \dot{x}_2}{\partial x_2}
+\frac{\partial \dot{p}_1}{\partial p_1}
+\frac{\partial \dot{p}_2}{\partial p_2}
=\frac{\partial }{\partial x_1}\frac{\partial H}{\partial p_1}
+\frac{\partial }{\partial x_2}\frac{\partial H}{\partial p_2}
-\frac{\partial }{\partial p_1}\frac{\partial H}{\partial x_1}
-\frac{\partial }{\partial p_2}\frac{\partial H}{\partial x_2}
=0$$
or $dV/dx_3 = 0$ and $dV = dx_1 dx_2 dp_1 dp_2 = \text{Constant}$ which means that the phase space volume is conserved as light travels along an optical system.

The volume occupied by a set of rays in phase space is called etendue, which is conserved as light rays progress in the optical system along direction x_{3}. This corresponds to Liouville's theorem, which also applies to Hamiltonian mechanics.

However, the meaning of Liouville’s theorem in mechanics is rather different from the theorem of conservation of étendue. Liouville’s theorem is essentially statistical in nature, and it refers to the evolution in time of an ensemble of mechanical systems of identical properties but with different initial conditions. Each system is represented by a single point in phase space, and the theorem states that the average density of points in phase space is constant in time. An example would be the molecules of a perfect classical gas in equilibrium in a container. Each point in phase space, which in this example has 2N dimensions, where N is the number of molecules, represents one of an ensemble of identical containers, an ensemble large enough to permit taking a statistical average of the density of representative points. Liouville’s theorem states that if all the containers remain in equilibrium, the average density of points remains constant.

=== Imaging and nonimaging optics ===
Figure "conservation of etendue" shows on the left a diagrammatic two-dimensional optical system in which x_{2}=0 and p_{2}=0 so light travels on the plane x_{1}x_{3} in directions of increasing x_{3} values.

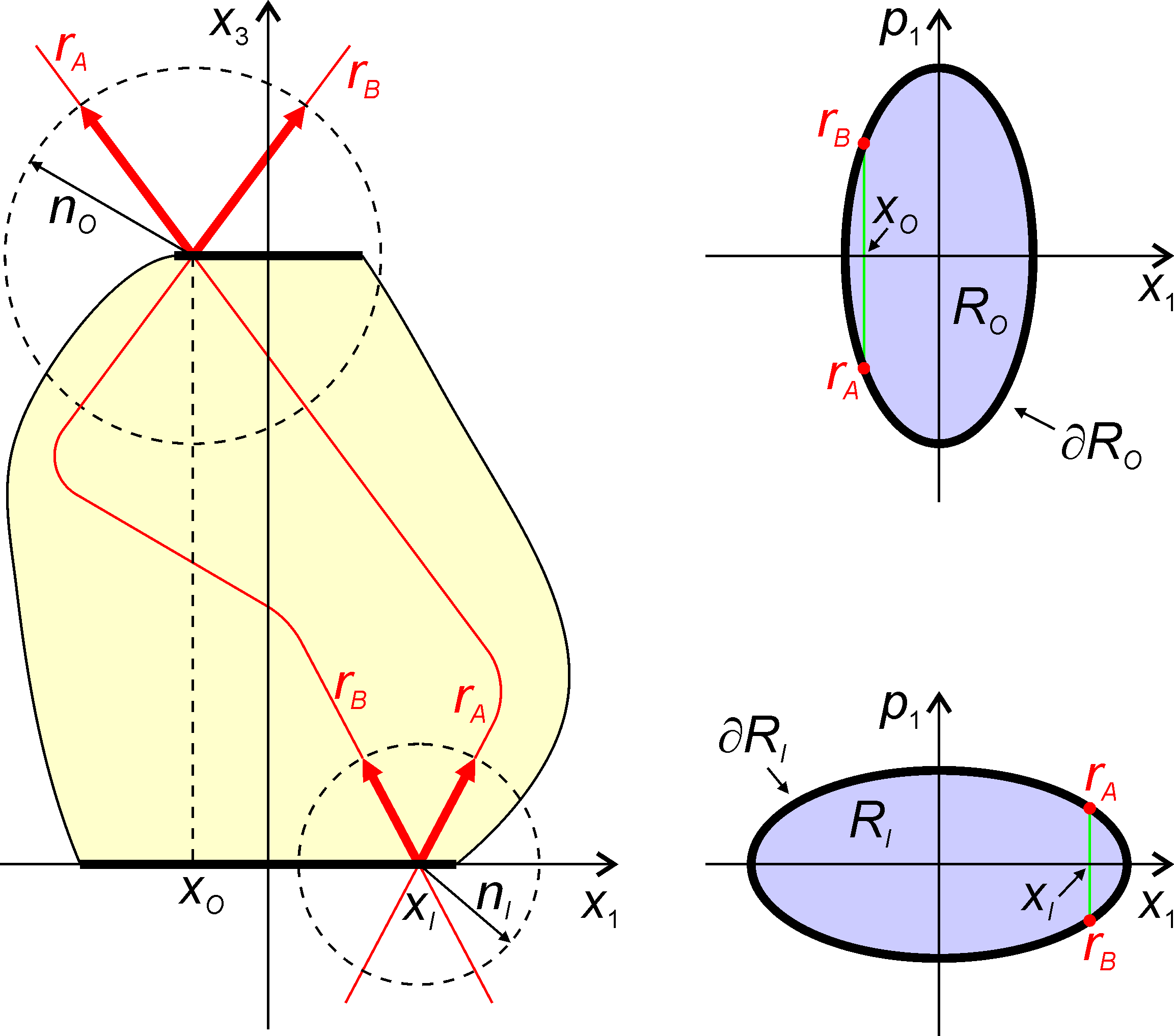
Conservation of etendue

Light rays crossing the input aperture of the optic at point x_{1}=x_{I} are contained between edge rays r_{A} and r_{B} represented by a vertical line between points r_{A} and r_{B} at the phase space of the input aperture (right, bottom corner of the figure). All rays crossing the input aperture are represented in phase space by a region R_{I}.

Also, light rays crossing the output aperture of the optic at point x_{1}=x_{O} are contained between edge rays r_{A} and r_{B} represented by a vertical line between points r_{A} and r_{B} at the phase space of the output aperture (right, top corner of the figure). All rays crossing the output aperture are represented in phase space by a region R_{O}.

Conservation of etendue in the optical system means that the volume (or area in this two-dimensional case) in phase space occupied by R_{I} at the input aperture must be the same as the volume in phase space occupied by R_{O} at the output aperture.

In imaging optics, all light rays crossing the input aperture at x_{1}=x_{I} are redirected by it towards the output aperture at x_{1}=x_{O} where x_{I}=m x_{O}. This ensures that an image of the input is formed at the output with a magnification m. In phase space, this means that vertical lines in the phase space at the input are transformed into vertical lines at the output. That would be the case of vertical line r_{A} r_{B} in R_{I} transformed to vertical line r_{A} r_{B} in R_{O}.

In nonimaging optics, the goal is not to form an image but simply to transfer all light from the input aperture to the output aperture. This is accomplished by transforming the edge rays ∂R_{I} of R_{I} to edge rays ∂R_{O} of R_{O}. This is known as the edge ray principle.

== Generalizations ==
Above it was assumed that light travels along the x_{3} axis, in Hamilton's principle above, coordinates $x_1$ and $x_2$ take the role of the generalized coordinates $q_k$ while $x_3$ takes the role of parameter $\sigma$, that is, parameter σ =x_{3} and N=2. However, different parametrizations of the light rays are possible, as well as the use of generalized coordinates.

=== General ray parametrization ===
A more general situation can be considered in which the path of a light ray is parametrized as $s=\left(x_1{\left(\sigma\right)},x_2{\left(\sigma\right)},x_3{\left(\sigma\right)}\right)$ in which σ is a general parameter. In this case, when compared to Hamilton's principle above, coordinates $x_1$, $x_2$ and $x_3$ take the role of the generalized coordinates $q_k$ with N=3. Applying Hamilton's principle to optics in this case leads to
$$\begin{align}
\delta S &= \delta\int_{\mathbf{A}}^{\mathbf{B}} n \, ds = \delta\int_{\sigma_A}^{\sigma_B} n \frac{ds}{d\sigma}\, d\sigma \\
&= \delta\int_{\sigma_A}^{\sigma_B} L\left(x_1,x_2,x_3,\dot{x}_1,\dot{x}_2,\dot{x}_3,\sigma\right)\, d\sigma = 0
\end{align}$$
where now $L = n ds/d\sigma$ and $\dot{x}_k=dx_k/d\sigma$ and for which the Euler–Lagrange equations applied to this form of Fermat's principle result in
$$\frac{\partial L}{\partial x_k} -
\frac{d}{d\sigma}\frac{\partial L}{\partial \dot x_k} = 0$$
with k=1,2,3 and where L is the optical Lagrangian. Also in this case the optical momentum is defined as
$$p_k=\frac{\partial L}{\partial \dot x_k}$$
and the Hamiltonian P is defined by the expression given above for N=3 corresponding to functions $x_1{\left(\sigma\right)}$, $x_2{\left(\sigma\right)}$ and $x_3{\left(\sigma\right)}$ to be determined
$$P = \dot{x}_1 p_1+\dot{x}_2 p_2+\dot{x}_3 p_3 - L$$

And the corresponding Hamilton's equations with k=1,2,3 applied optics are
$$\frac{\partial H}{\partial x_k} =- \dot{p}_k \,, \quad \frac{\partial H}{\partial p_k} = \dot{x}_k$$
with $\dot{x}_k=dx_k/d\sigma$ and $\dot{p}_k = dp_k/d\sigma$.

The optical Lagrangian is given by
$$L=n\frac{ds}{d\sigma}=n\left(x_1,x_2,x_3\right) \sqrt{\dot{x}_1^2+\dot{x}_2^2+\dot{x}_3^2}=L\left(x_1,x_2,x_3,\dot{x}_1,\dot{x}_2,\dot{x}_3\right)$$
and does not explicitly depend on parameter σ. For that reason not all solutions of the Euler–Lagrange equations will be possible light rays, since their derivation assumed an explicit dependence of L on σ which does not happen in optics.

The optical momentum components can be obtained from
$$p_k=n\frac{\dot{x}_k}{\sqrt{\dot{x}_1^2+\dot{x}_2^2+\dot{x}_3^2}}
=n\frac{dx_k}{\sqrt{dx_1^2+dx_2^2+dx_3^2}}
=n\frac{dx_k}{ds}$$
where $\dot{x}_k=dx_k/d\sigma$. The expression for the Lagrangian can be rewritten as
$$\begin{align}
L &= n\sqrt{\dot{x}_1^2+\dot{x}_2^2+\dot{x}_3^2}
=\dot{x}_1\frac{n \dot{x}_1}{\sqrt{\dot{x}_1^2+\dot{x}_2^2+\dot{x}_3^2}}+\dot{x}_2\frac{n \dot{x}_2}{\sqrt{\dot{x}_1^2+\dot{x}_2^2+\dot{x}_3^2}}+\dot{x}_3\frac{n \dot{x}_3}{\sqrt{\dot{x}_1^2+\dot{x}_2^2+\dot{x}_3^2}} \\
&=\dot{x}_1 p_1+\dot{x}_2 p_2+\dot{x}_3 p_3
\end{align}$$

Comparing this expression for L with that for the Hamiltonian P it can be concluded that
$$P = 0$$

From the expressions for the components $p_k$ of the optical momentum results
$$p_1^2+p_2^2+p_3^2-n^2\left(x_1,x_2,x_3\right)=0$$

The optical Hamiltonian is chosen as
$$P = p_1^2 + p_2^2 + p_3^2 - n^2\left(x_1,x_2,x_3\right) = 0$$

although other choices could be made. The Hamilton's equations with k = 1, 2, 3 defined above together with $P=0$ define the possible light rays.

=== Generalized coordinates ===
As in Hamiltonian mechanics, it is also possible to write the equations of Hamiltonian optics in terms of generalized coordinates $\left(q_1\left(\sigma\right),q_2\left(\sigma\right),q_3\left(\sigma\right)\right)$, generalized momenta $\left(u_1\left(\sigma\right),u_2\left(\sigma\right),u_3\left(\sigma\right)\right)$ and Hamiltonian P as

$$\begin{align}
\frac{dq_1}{d\sigma} &= \frac{\partial P}{\partial u_1} \quad \quad \frac{du_1}{d\sigma} =-\frac{\partial P}{\partial q_1} \\
\frac{dq_2}{d\sigma} &= \frac{\partial P}{\partial u_2} \quad \quad \frac{du_2}{d\sigma} =-\frac{\partial P}{\partial q_2} \\
\frac{dq_3}{d\sigma} &= \frac{\partial P}{\partial u_3} \quad \quad \frac{du_3}{d\sigma} =-\frac{\partial P}{\partial q_3} \\
P &= \mathbf{p}\cdot\mathbf{p}-n^2 = 0
\end{align}$$
where the optical momentum is given by
$$\begin{align}
\mathbf{p} &= u_1 \nabla q_1+u_2 \nabla q_2+u_3 \nabla q_3 \\
&= u_1 \|\nabla q_1 \| \frac{\nabla q_1}{\|\nabla q_1 \|}
+u_2 \|\nabla q_2 \| \frac{\nabla q_2}{\|\nabla q_2 \|}
+u_3 \|\nabla q_3 \| \frac{\nabla q_3}{\|\nabla q_3 \|} \\
&= u_1 a_1 \mathbf{\hat{e}}_1 + u_2 a_2 \mathbf{\hat{e}}_2 + u_3 a_3 \mathbf{\hat{e}}_3
\end{align}$$
and $\mathbf{\hat{e}}_1$, $\mathbf{\hat{e}}_2$ and $\mathbf{\hat{e}}_3$ are unit vectors. A particular case is obtained when these vectors form an orthonormal basis, that is, they are all perpendicular to each other. In that case, $u_k a_k/n$ is the cosine of the angle the optical momentum $\mathbf{p}$ makes to unit vector $\mathbf{\hat{e}}_k$.

== See also ==
- Learning materials related to a simple one-dimensional derivation of Hamiltonian optics at Wikiversity
- Hamiltonian mechanics
- Hamilton's optico-mechanical analogy
- Calculus of variations
