= Winston cone =

A Winston cone is a non-imaging light collector in the shape of an off-axis parabola of revolution with a reflective inner surface. It concentrates the light passing through a relatively large entrance aperture through a smaller exit aperture. The collection of incoming rays is maximized by allowing off-axis rays to make multiple reflections before reaching the exit aperture. Winston cones are used to concentrate light from a large area onto a smaller photodetector or photomultiplier. They are widely used for measurements in the far infrared portion of the electromagnetic spectrum in part because there are no suitable materials to form lenses in the range.

Winston cones were invented by physicist Roland Winston. It is commercialized by companies such as Winston Cone Optics

== See also ==
- Nonimaging optics
