= Solid-state lighting =

Lighting technology

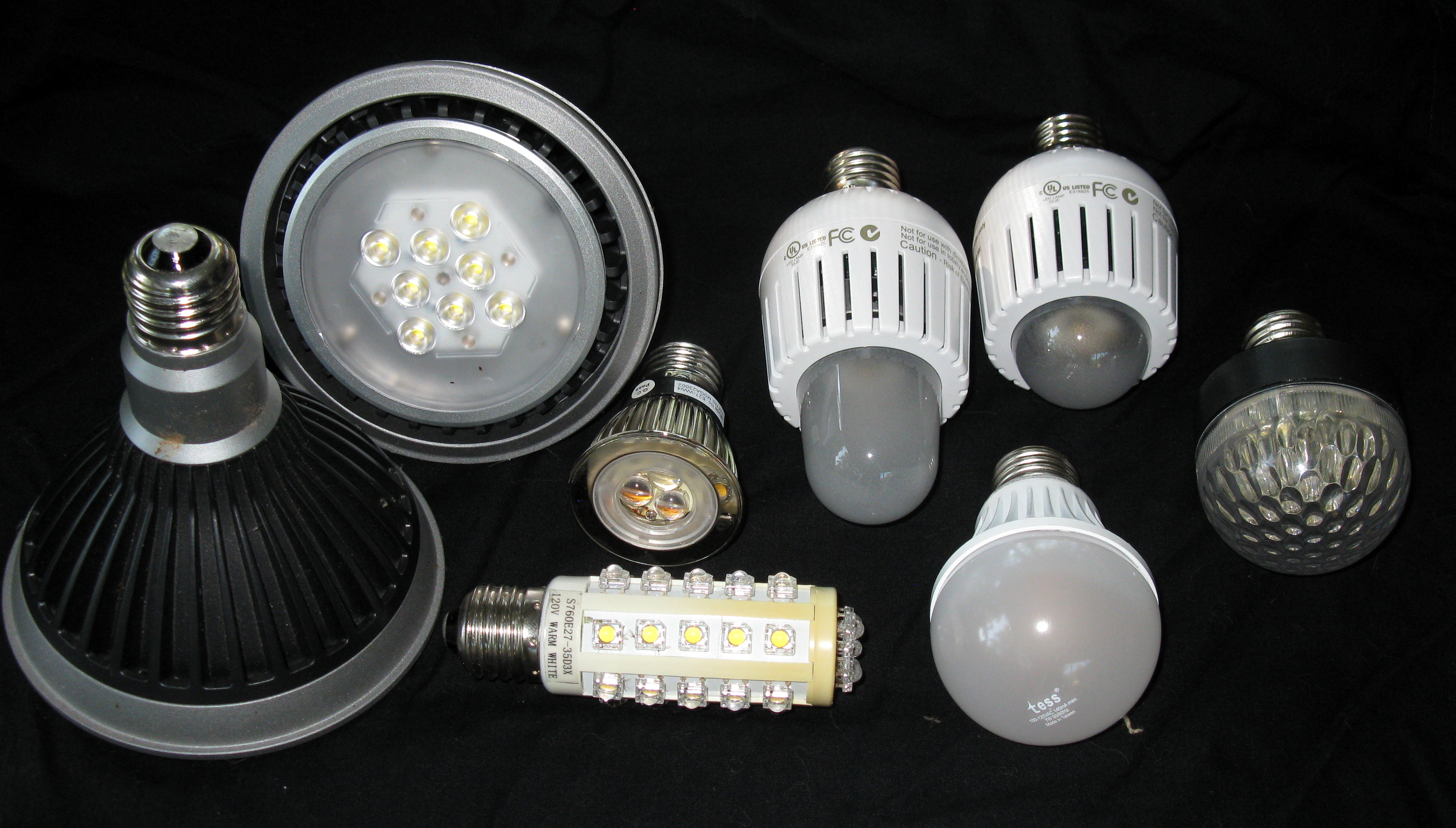
An assortment of LED lamps commercially available as of 2010 as replacements for screw-in bulbs, including floodlight fixtures (left), reading light (center), household lamps (center right and bottom), and low-power accent light (right) applications

Solid-state lighting (SSL) is a type of lighting that uses semiconductor light-emitting diodes (LEDs), organic light-emitting diodes (OLED), or polymer light-emitting diodes (PLED) as sources of illumination rather than electrical filaments, plasma (used in arc lamps such as fluorescent lamps), or gas.

Solid state electroluminescence is used in SSL, as opposed to incandescent bulbs (which use thermal radiation) or fluorescent tubes. Compared to incandescent lighting, SSL creates visible light with reduced heat generation and less energy dissipation. Most common "white LEDs” convert blue light from a solid-state device to an (approximate) white light spectrum using photoluminescence, the same principle used in conventional fluorescent tubes.

The typically small mass of a solid-state electronic lighting device provides for greater resistance to shock and vibration compared to brittle glass tubes/bulbs and long, thin filament wires. They also eliminate filament evaporation, potentially increasing the life span of the illumination device.

Solid-state lighting is often used in traffic lights and is also used in modern vehicle lights, street and parking lot lights, train marker lights, building exteriors, remote controls etc. Controlling the light emission of LEDs may be done most effectively by using the principles of nonimaging optics. Solid-state lighting has made significant advances in industry. In the entertainment lighting industry, standard incandescent tungsten-halogen lamps are being replaced by solid-state lighting fixtures.

== See also ==
- L Prize
- LED lamp
- List of light sources
- Smart lighting
