= Optical path length =

Product of geometric length and refractive index

In optics, optical path length (OPL, denoted Λ in equations), also known as optical length or optical distance, is the vacuum length that light travels over the same time taken to travel through a given medium length. For a homogeneous medium through which the light ray propagates, it is calculated as taking the product of the geometric length of the optical path followed by light and the refractive index of the medium. For inhomogeneous optical media, the product above is generalized as a path integral as part of the ray tracing procedure. A difference in OPL between two paths is often called the optical path difference (OPD). OPL and OPD are important because they determine the phase of the light and govern interference and diffraction of light as it propagates.

In a medium of constant refractive index, n, the OPL for a path of geometrical length s is just

$$\Lambda = n s .$$

If the refractive index varies along the path, the OPL is given by a line integral

$$\Lambda = \int_C n \mathrm ds,$$

where n is the local refractive index as a function of position along the path C. This can be re-written as $\Lambda = \bar{n} \left| C \right|$ where $\bar{n} = \frac{\int_C n \mathrm ds}{\left| C \right|}$ is the average refractive index over the path C of geometric length |C|.

An electromagnetic wave propagating along a path C has the phase shift over C as if it was propagating a path in a vacuum, the length of which is equal to the OPL of C. For single frequency (monochromatic) light, the phase shift over C is $\Delta \varphi = k_0\Lambda = k_0\int_C n \mathrm ds$ where k_{0} is the vacuum angular wavenumber. (Note: For example, a single frequency light traveling in a medium with the refractive index n is often expressed in a simplified formula $E\left( t,x \right) = A \cos \left( \omega t - kx + \varphi \right)$, where $\omega$ and $k = k_0 n$ are the angular frequency and the wavenumber of the light respectively ($k_0 = \frac{2\pi}{\lambda_0}$ is the vacuum wavenumber), and $-k$ indicates that the light travels towards +$\infty$ in the x-axis. ... in cos(...) is the phase of the light. In a homogeneous medium of refractive index $n$, a monochromatic plane wave may be written in the simplified form $E(t,x)=A\cos(\omega t-kx+\varphi)$, where $k=nk_0$ and $k_0=2\pi/\lambda_0$ is the vacuum wavenumber. Over a path of geometric length $s$ in such a medium, the phase shift is $ks = k_0ns = k_0\Lambda$, where $\Lambda = ns$ is the optical path length. More generally, for a path $C$ in an inhomogeneous medium, the phase shift is $\Delta\varphi = k_0\int_C n\,\mathrm ds = k_0\Lambda$, where $\Lambda$ is the optical path length of $C$.) Thus, if a wave travels through several different media, the optical path lengths of the individual segments may be added to obtain the total OPL. In wave interference, the difference between the optical path lengths of two coherent waves (for example, a laser beam split into two paths by a beam splitter) determines the corresponding phase difference at their common destination, and thus the corresponding interference patterns.

For a monochromatic wave emitted from a point source, a wavefront is a surface of constant phase. In geometrical optics, this means that the optical path length from the source to each point on a given wavefront is the same, up to an integer multiple of the wavelength.

Fermat's principle states the physical ray path is one for which the optical path length is stationary with respect to nearby paths. In many elementary cases, this means that the path light takes between two points is the path that has the minimum OPL.

== Optical path difference ==
The optical path difference (OPD) is the difference between the optical path lengths of two rays or beams reaching a common point. For monochromatic light, the OPD determines the corresponding phase difference through

$$\Delta \varphi = k_0\,\mathrm{OPD},$$

where $k_0$ is the vacuum angular wavenumber. For example, over the same geometric distance, light traveling in glass has a larger optical path length than light traveling in air because glass has a larger refractive index.

In general, if two rays follow paths $C_1$ and $C_2$, then

$$\mathrm{OPD}= \Lambda_1 - \Lambda_2 = \int_{C_1} n\,ds - \int_{C_2} n\,ds.$$

In the special case where each ray travels through a homogeneous medium of constant refractive index, this reduces to

$$\mathrm{OPD}= d_1 n_1 - d_2 n_2,$$

where d_{1} and d_{2} are the geometric lengths of the two paths and n_{1}, n_{2} are the corresponding refractive indices.

== See also ==
- Air mass (astronomy)
- Lagrangian optics
- Hamiltonian optics
- Fermat's principle
- Optical depth
